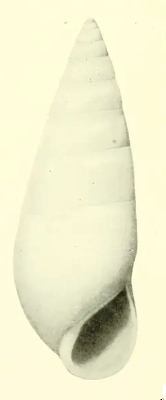
- Shell of Melanella hemphilli (original image)

Scientific classification
- Kingdom: Animalia
- Phylum: Mollusca
- Class: Gastropoda
- Subclass: Caenogastropoda
- Order: Littorinimorpha
- Family: Eulimidae
- Genus: Melanella
- Species: M. hemphilli

Binomial name
- Melanella hemphilli (Bartsch, 1917)

Synonyms
- Melanella (Melanella) hemphilli Bartsch, 1917 superseded combination

= Melanella hemphilli =

Species of gastropod

Melanella hemphilli is a species of sea snail, a marine gastropod mollusk in the family Eulimidae. The species is one of many species known to exist within the genus, Melanella.

== Description ==
The length of the shell attains 8.3 mm, its diameter 3 mm.

(Oroginal description) The shell is straight, stout, and elongate-conic. It is polished and marked by exceedingly fine lines of growth and by scarcely perceptible microscopic spiral striations, the two together forming an exceedingly fine and very regular incised grating on the surface; its color is bluish white. The ten whorls are moderately rounded and very slightly constricted at the sutures. The periphery of the body whorl is well rounded. The base is moderately long, but somewhat inflated, and well rounded. The aperture is small and oval, with an acute posterior angle; the outer lip is thin at the edge, which is scarcely at all drawn forward between the posterior angle and the base. The parietal wall is covered with a thick callus.

== Distribution ==
This species occurs off the Pacific coast of Lower California, Mexico; also off the Dominican Republic.
