= Melanella johnsoni =

- Shell of † Melanella johnsoni

Scientific classification
- Kingdom: Animalia
- Phylum: Mollusca
- Class: Gastropoda
- Subclass: Caenogastropoda
- Order: Littorinimorpha
- Family: Eulimidae
- Genus: Melanella
- Species: †M. johnsoni

Binomial name
- †Melanella johnsoni G D. Hanna, 1924

Synonyms
- † Melanella gabbiana Pilsbry & C. W. Johnson, 1917 (junior secondary homonym of Eulimella gabbiana Anderson & Martin, 1914; Melanella johnsoni is a replacement name)

Species of gastropod

Melanella johnsoni is an extinct species of sea snail, a marine gastropod mollusk in the family Eulimidae.

The status of this species is uncertain as unassessed.

== Description ==
The altitude of the figured specimen (with upper whorls lost) is 4 mm, and the maximum width is 1.3 mm

(Original description as Melanella gabbiana ) The very small shell is slender, smooth, and polished. It consists of numerous whorls. The apex is acute (though it is broken in the type specimen). The whorls are nearly flat and unsculptured, while the suture is appressed and indistinct. The base is unflattened. The aperture is ovally elongated. The outer lip is sharply rounded anteriorly, and the inner lip is concave and incrusted.

== Distribution ==
Fossils of this species were found in Lower Miocene strata in California.
