= Melanella bicurvata =

Scientific classification
- Kingdom: Animalia
- Phylum: Mollusca
- Class: Gastropoda
- Subclass: Caenogastropoda
- Order: Littorinimorpha
- Family: Eulimidae
- Genus: Melanella
- Species: †M. bicurvata

Binomial name
- †Melanella bicurvata (Chapman & Crespin, 1928)

Synonyms
- † Eulima bicurvata Chapman & Crespin, 1928 superseded combination

Species of gastropod

Melanella bicurvata is an extinct species of sea snail, a marine gastropod mollusk in the family Eulimidae.

== Distribution ==
Fossils of this species were found in Middle Miocene strata in Victoria, Australia
