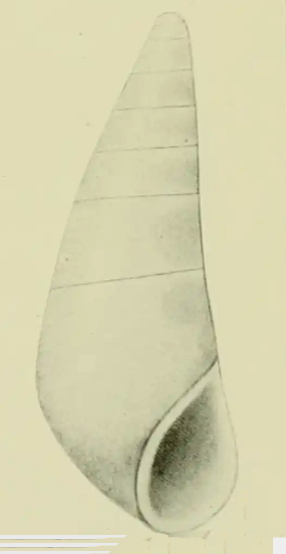
- Shell of Melanella montereyensis (original image)

Scientific classification
- Kingdom: Animalia
- Phylum: Mollusca
- Class: Gastropoda
- Subclass: Caenogastropoda
- Order: Littorinimorpha
- Family: Eulimidae
- Genus: Melanella
- Species: M. montereyensis

Binomial name
- Melanella montereyensis Bartsch, 1917

Synonyms
- Melanella (Balcis) montereyensis Bartsch, 1917 superseded combination

= Melanella montereyensis =

Species of gastropod

Melanella montereyensis is a species of sea snail, a marine gastropod mollusk in the family Eulimidae. The species is one of many species known to exist within the genus, Melanella.

== Description ==
The length of the shell attains 5 mm, its diameter 2.2 mm.

(Original description) The shell is broadly conic and falcate, flexed to the right, and it is bluish-white, with a series of opaque areas marking the varicial streaks. The first three whorls are probably lost, with eight whorls remaining. The early whorls are well rounded, while the later ones are slightly rounded, a little more so on the convex than on the concave side. The sutures are scarcely marked. The posterior termination on the inside of the whorls shines through the substance of the shell and appears as a conspicuous false suture. The periphery is weakly angulated. The base is short and very strongly curved on the left side. The aperture is short and broadly oval, with an acute posterior angle; the outer lip is quite strongly protracted at the periphery; the inner lip is oblique, curved, reflected, and appressed to the base; and the parietal wall is covered by a thick callus.

== Distribution ==
This species occurs off the Pacific coast of Canada and California.
