= Melanella cunaeformis =

Melanellacunaeformis
- Shell of Melanella cunaeformis (holotype)

Scientific classification
- Kingdom: Animalia
- Phylum: Mollusca
- Class: Gastropoda
- Subclass: Caenogastropoda
- Order: Littorinimorpha
- Family: Eulimidae
- Genus: Melanella
- Species: M. cunaeformis

Binomial name
- Melanella cunaeformis (May, 1915)

Synonyms
- Eulima cunaeformis May, 1915 (original combination)

Species of gastropod

Melanella cunaeformis is a species of sea snail, a marine gastropod mollusk in the family Eulimidae.

== Description ==
The length of the shell attains 4 mm, its diameter 1.5 mm.

(Original description) The yellowish-white shell is highly polished. It is narrowly pyramidal, slightly curved, with a blunt apex. The shell contains 8 slightly rounded whorls. The suture is distinct. The base of the preceding whorl shows clearly through the shell. The body whorl is tumidly developed.The small aperture is pyriform. The umbilical area is broadly excavate.

== Distribution ==
This marine species is endemic to Australia and occurs off South Australia and Tasmania
