= Melanella robusta =

Scientific classification
- Kingdom: Animalia
- Phylum: Mollusca
- Class: Gastropoda
- Subclass: Caenogastropoda
- Order: Littorinimorpha
- Family: Eulimidae
- Genus: Melanella
- Species: M. robusta

Binomial name
- Melanella robusta (A. Adams, 1861)

Synonyms
- Eulima robusta A. Adams, 1861

Species of gastropod

Melanella robusta is a species of sea snail, a marine gastropod mollusk in the family Eulimidae. The species is one of many species known to exist within the genus, Melanella.

== Description ==
(Original description in Latin) The shell is pyramidally awl-shaped and flexuous, with a recurved apex. It consists of slightly convex whorls, the last of which is large and oblique, becoming rounded toward the base. The sutures are margined. The aperture is oval and produced, with the inner lip thickened above, while the outer lip is arched. The shell is milky white and semi-opaque.

== Distribution ==
This species occurs in the Sea of Japan.
