= Melanella penna =

Scientific classification
- Kingdom: Animalia
- Phylum: Mollusca
- Class: Gastropoda
- Subclass: Caenogastropoda
- Order: Littorinimorpha
- Family: Eulimidae
- Genus: Melanella
- Species: M. penna

Binomial name
- Melanella penna Dall, 1927

Species of gastropod

Melanella penna is a species of sea snail, a marine gastropod mollusk in the family Eulimidae. The species is one of many species known to exist within the genus, Melanella.

== Description ==
The lengt of the shell attains 5.7 mm, its diameter 2 mm.

(Original description) The small shell is conical, smooth, polished, and creamy white. It has a blunt apex and eight flattened whorls. The suture is obscure, appressed, and lightly overglazed. The surface is devoid of sculpture. The aperture is semilunate, with a simple and somewhat flexuous outer lip. The body whorl bears a layer of enamel, while the inner lip is slightly concave and has a perceptible umbilical depression behind it. The base is evenly rounded.

== Distribution ==
This species occurs in the Atlantic Ocean off Florida, USA.
