= Melanella tortuosa =

- Shell of Melanella tortuosa (original image)

Scientific classification
- Kingdom: Animalia
- Phylum: Mollusca
- Class: Gastropoda
- Subclass: Caenogastropoda
- Order: Littorinimorpha
- Family: Eulimidae
- Genus: Melanella
- Species: M. tortuosa

Binomial name
- Melanella tortuosa (A. Adams & Reeve, 1850)

Synonyms
- Eulima tortuosa A. Adams & Reeve, 1850 superseded combination

Species of gastropod

Melanella tortuosa is a species of sea snail, a marine gastropod mollusk in the family Eulimidae. The species is one of many species known to exist within the genus, Melanella.

== Description ==
(Original description in Latin) The shell is twisted-acuminate, with 12 to 14 flat, contiguous whorls that are obliquely varicose. The aperture is rather small. The shell is ivory-white and obscurely lined below the sutures.

== Distribution ==
This marine species occurs off Japan and in the China Sea.
