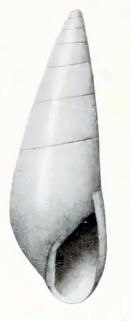
- Shell of Melanella compacta (original image)

Scientific classification
- Kingdom: Animalia
- Phylum: Mollusca
- Class: Gastropoda
- Subclass: Caenogastropoda
- Order: Littorinimorpha
- Family: Eulimidae
- Genus: Melanella
- Species: M. compacta

Binomial name
- Melanella compacta (P. P. Carpenter, 1864)

Synonyms
- Balcis compacta (P. P. Carpenter, 1864) superseded combination; Eulima compacta P. P. Carpenter, 1864 superseded combination

= Melanella compacta =

Species of gastropod

Melanella compacta is a species of sea snail, a marine gastropod mollusk in the family Eulimidae. The species is one of many species known to exist within the genus, Melanella.

== Description ==
The length of the shell attains 6.8 mm, its diameter 2. mm.

The shell is broadly elongate-conic, straight, and highly polished, with the surface marked by exceedingly fine lines of growth and scarcely perceptible microscopic spiral striations. The holotype contains eight whorls (first whorl lost). The whorls are flattened and separated by a very faintly defined suture. In fact, the basal portion of the preceding whorl shines through the substance of the succeeding turn, causing this translucent portion to appear as the suture. The periphery of the body whorl is well rounded, as is the moderately long and gently rounded base. The aperture is quite long and oval, with an acute posterior angle. The outer lip is thin and projects slightly anteriorly at a point a little beyond the middle between the posterior angle and the base. The inner lip is slightly curved and rather thick; it is reflected over the base and closely appressed to it. The parietal wall is covered by a moderately strong callus.

== Distribution ==
This species occurs off the Pacific coast of California and of Mexico
