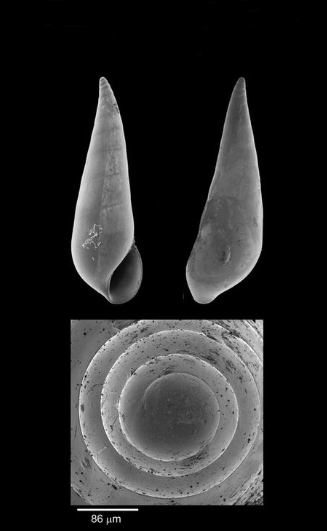
- Shell of Melanella anachorea (holotype at the Smithsonian Institution, National Museum of Natural History)

Scientific classification
- Kingdom: Animalia
- Phylum: Mollusca
- Class: Gastropoda
- Subclass: Caenogastropoda
- Order: Littorinimorpha
- Family: Eulimidae
- Genus: Melanella
- Species: M. anachorea

Binomial name
- Melanella anachorea Dall, 1927

= Melanella anachorea =

Species of gastropod

Melanella anachorea is a species of sea snail, a marine gastropod mollusk in the family Eulimidae. The species is one of many species known to exist within the genus, Melanella.

== Description ==
The maximum recorded shell length is 5 mm, its diameter 1.5 mm.

(Original description) The thin shell is minute, smooth, transparent, and whitish. The minute apex is slightly brownish and blunt. The shell bears about ten whorls, and the spire is slightly bent backward. The suture is appressed and glazed over, and the whorls are flattish. The base is rounded and imperforate. The aperture is narrowly sublunate. The outer lip is thin and moderately convexly arcuate. The inner lip is very short and thin, and the body lacks enamel.

== Distribution ==
This species occurs in the Atlantic ocean off Florida and Georgia, USA.

== Habitat ==
Minimum recorded depth is 805 m. Maximum recorded depth is 805 m.
