= Melanella opaca =

- Drawing of a shell of Melanella opaca (original image)

Scientific classification
- Kingdom: Animalia
- Phylum: Mollusca
- Class: Gastropoda
- Subclass: Caenogastropoda
- Order: Littorinimorpha
- Family: Eulimidae
- Genus: Melanella
- Species: M. opaca

Binomial name
- Melanella opaca (G. B. Sowerby II, 1865)

Synonyms
- Eulima opaca G. B. Sowerby II, 1865

Species of gastropod

Melanella opaca, common name the opaque Eulima, is a species of sea snail, a marine gastropod mollusk in the family Eulimidae. The species is one of many species known to exist within the genus, Melanella.

== Description ==
(Original description) The shell is rather straight and subulate, slightly oval, white, opaque, and solid. The whorls are a little convex, and the body whorl is oval. The aperture is ovate, the outer lip is thick and nearly straight.

== Distribution ==
This marine species occurs off Hawaii.
