= Melanella elsa =

Scientific classification
- Kingdom: Animalia
- Phylum: Mollusca
- Class: Gastropoda
- Subclass: Caenogastropoda
- Order: Littorinimorpha
- Family: Eulimidae
- Genus: Melanella
- Species: M. elsa

Binomial name
- Melanella elsa Thiele, 1930

Species of gastropod

Melanella elsa is a species of sea snail, a marine gastropod mollusk in the family Eulimidae. The species is one of a number within the genus Melanella.

== Distribution ==
This marine species is endemic to Australia and occurs off Western Australia.
