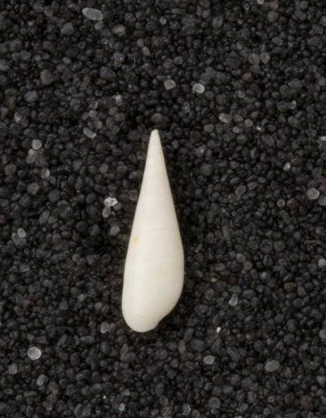
- Shell of Melanella peninsularis

Scientific classification
- Kingdom: Animalia
- Phylum: Mollusca
- Class: Gastropoda
- Subclass: Caenogastropoda
- Order: Littorinimorpha
- Family: Eulimidae
- Genus: Melanella
- Species: M. peninsularis

Binomial name
- Melanella peninsularis Bartsch, 1917

Synonyms
- Melanella (Balcis) peninsularis Bartsch, 1917 alternative representation

= Melanella peninsularis =

Species of gastropod

Melanella peninsularis is a species of sea snail, a marine gastropod mollusk in the family Eulimidae. The species is one of many species known to exist within the genus, Melanella.

== Description ==
The length of the shell attains 5.2 mm, its diameter 2.2 mm.

(Original description) The elongate-conic shell is slightly curved, and it is polished, with the surface marked by exceedingly fine lines of growth and by very fine microscopic spiral striations. It is bluish-white where the animal shines through the substance of the shell, where it appears brown. The whorls are separated by a very poorly defined suture, which is inconspicuous compared with the false suture caused by the base of the preceding whorl shining through the substance of the succeeding whorl. The whorls are marked at irregular intervals by thickened varices, which are very prominent. The periphery of the body whorl is well rounded. The base is short and slightly rounded, with the left side sloping very obliquely. The aperture is broadly open, with an acute posterior angle; the outer lip is decidedly protracted halfway between the posterior angle and the base; the inner lip is very oblique, moderately robust, slightly curved, reflected over, and appressed to the base; and the parietal wall is covered by a thick callus.

== Distribution ==
This species occurs off the Pacific coast of Lower California and off Mexico

Fossils were found in Pleistocene strata at Los Angeles, California.
