= Melanella ogasawarana =

- Shell of Melanella ogasawarana

Scientific classification
- Kingdom: Animalia
- Phylum: Mollusca
- Class: Gastropoda
- Subclass: Caenogastropoda
- Order: Littorinimorpha
- Family: Eulimidae
- Genus: Melanella
- Species: M. ogasawarana

Binomial name
- Melanella ogasawarana (Pilsbry, 1905)

Synonyms
- Eulima ogasawarana Pilsbry, 1905 ·

Species of gastropod

Melanella ogasawarana is a species of sea snail, a marine gastropod mollusk in the family Eulimidae. The species is one of many species known to exist within the genus, Melanella.

== Description ==
The length of the shell attains 11.3 mm, its diameter 3.5 mm.

(Original description) The thick and solid shell is white, and polished. The spire is somewhat attenuated above, noticeably deflected, and acute. There are 12 or 13 nearly flat whorls, separated by a distinct, impressed suture.

The varices are very few, with only three or four occurring on the entire shell; they are irregularly placed and deeply impressed. The aperture is small, ovate, and vertical. The outer lip is very thick but is only slightly arched forwards in the middle. The columella is heavily calloused and bears a broadly reflexed, appressed edge.

== Distribution ==
This species occurs in the Sea of Japan; also off Taiwan, the Comoros, French Polynesia, New Caledonia and Costa Rica.
