= Melanella pinguicula =

Scientific classification
- Kingdom: Animalia
- Phylum: Mollusca
- Class: Gastropoda
- Subclass: Caenogastropoda
- Order: Littorinimorpha
- Family: Eulimidae
- Genus: Melanella
- Species: †M. pinguicula

Binomial name
- †Melanella pinguicula (Chapman & Gabriel, 1914)

Synonyms
- † Eulima pinguicula (Chapman & Gabriel, 1914) superseded combination

Species of gastropod

Melanella pinguicula is an extinct species of sea snail, a marine gastropod mollusk in the family Eulimidae.

== Distribution ==
Fossils of this species were found in Middle Miocene strata in Victoria, Australia
