= Melanella seguenzai =

- Shell of Melanella seguenzai (holotype)

Scientific classification
- Kingdom: Animalia
- Phylum: Mollusca
- Class: Gastropoda
- Subclass: Caenogastropoda
- Order: Littorinimorpha
- Family: Eulimidae
- Genus: Melanella
- Species: †M. seguenzai

Binomial name
- †Melanella seguenzai Di Geronimo & La Perna, 1999

Species of gastropod

Melanella seguenzai is an extinct species of sea snail, a marine gastropod mollusk in the family Eulimidae. The species is one of a number within the genus Melanella.

== Description ==
(Original description) The shell is small, conical, slender, and straight to very faintly curved. The apex is blunt, and the spire is slightly concave to almost straight.

The protoconch is somewhat cylindrical, 350–500 µm in height and 280–340 µm in breadth. It consists of a little more than 1.5 smooth, moderately inflated whorls, with a metamorphic line forming a slightly sigmoid scar.

The teleoconch consists of up to approximately eight whorls (seven in the holotype), which are moderately convex above the suture. The sutures are distinct, and there is a suprasutural constriction. The body whorl constitutes approximately 0.4 of the shell height; its periphery is narrowly rounded, and the base is convex.

The teleoconch microsculpture consists of dense, almost straight lines, approximately 10 per 100 µm, which extend from suture to suture and are almost lost on the base. The incremental scars are deeply incised, occur 0.8–1.3 whorls apart, and number seven in the holotype.

The aperture is approximately 0.5 of the height of the body whorl. It is ovate, angulate posteriorly, and widest at its midpoint. The columellar and parietal callus is conspicuous; the columellar callus is slightly expanded externally. The columella is arched.

The outer lip is curved, with its lower part slightly protruding in frontal view. It is orthocline and shallowly sinuate below the suture; in lateral view, its most projecting part lies below the midpoint.

== Distribution ==
Fossils of this bathyal species were found in Pleistocene strata in the Mediterranean Sea at the Strait of Messina, Italy.
