= Melanella solida =

- Drawing of a shell of Melanella solida (original image)

Scientific classification
- Kingdom: Animalia
- Phylum: Mollusca
- Class: Gastropoda
- Subclass: Caenogastropoda
- Order: Littorinimorpha
- Family: Eulimidae
- Genus: Melanella
- Species: M. solida

Binomial name
- Melanella solida (G. B. Sowerby II, 1865)

Synonyms
- Eulima solida G. B. Sowerby II, 1865

Species of gastropod

Melanella solida, common name the solid Eulima, is a species of sea snail, a marine gastropod mollusk in the family Eulimidae. The species is one of many species known to exist within the genus, Melanella.

== Description ==
(Original description) The shell is small and rather straight, ovately subventricose, solid, and white. The whorls are scarcely convex, and the body whorl has a rounded angle. The aperture is small and oval, and the outer lip is thick and a little produced in the middle.

== Distribution ==
This marine species occurs off Hawaii.
