= Melanella parallela =

Scientific classification
- Kingdom: Animalia
- Phylum: Mollusca
- Class: Gastropoda
- Subclass: Caenogastropoda
- Order: Littorinimorpha
- Family: Eulimidae
- Genus: Melanella
- Species: M. parallela

Binomial name
- Melanella parallela Dall, 1927

Species of gastropod

Melanella parallela is a species of sea snail, a marine gastropod mollusk in the family Eulimidae. The species is one of many species known to exist within the genus, Melanella.

== Description ==
The lengt of the shell attains 5 mm, its diameter 1.2 mm.

(Original description) The small shell is slender, white, and straight. It has a slightly irregular, minute protoconch and approximately nine whorls. The suture is distinct and not glazed over, and each whorl bears one or more varical grooves. The sides of the whorls are flat and are also marked by faint, irregular axial wrinkles. In the later part of the shell, the anterior edge of each whorl becomes slightly bulging. The aperture is ovate, with the body and columella covered by a coat of enamel. The base is rather abruptly rounded and imperforate, with a narrow depression behind the inner lip. The outer lip is very slightly arcuate.

== Distribution ==
This species occurs in the Atlantic Ocean off Georgia, USA.
