= Melanella yamazii =

Scientific classification
- Kingdom: Animalia
- Phylum: Mollusca
- Class: Gastropoda
- Subclass: Caenogastropoda
- Order: Littorinimorpha
- Family: Eulimidae
- Genus: Melanella
- Species: M. yamazii

Binomial name
- Melanella yamazii (T. Habe, 1952)

Synonyms
- Balcis yamazii T. Habe, 1952 superseded combination

Species of gastropod

Melanella yamazii is a species of sea snail, a marine gastropod mollusk in the family Eulimidae.

== Distribution ==
This marine species occurs off Honshu, Japan.
