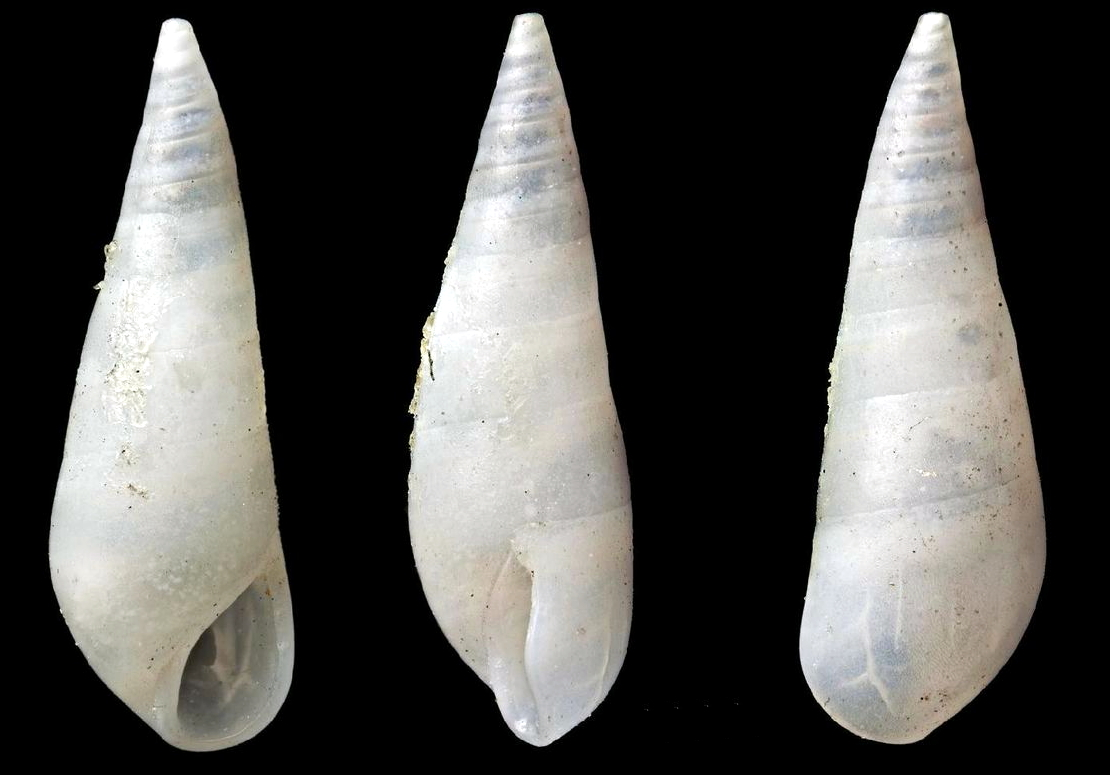
- Shell of Melanella atlantica (syntype at the Natural History Museum, London)

Scientific classification
- Kingdom: Animalia
- Phylum: Mollusca
- Class: Gastropoda
- Subclass: Caenogastropoda
- Order: Littorinimorpha
- Family: Eulimidae
- Genus: Melanella
- Species: M. atlantica

Binomial name
- Melanella atlantica (E. A. Smith, 1890à

Synonyms
- Balcis atlantica (E. A. Smith, 1890); Eulima atlantica E. A. Smith, 1890

= Melanella atlantica =

Species of gastropod

Melanella atlantica is a species of sea snail, a marine gastropod mollusk in the family Eulimidae. The species is one of many species known to exist within the genus, Melanella.

== Description ==
The length of the shell attains 7⅓ mm, its diameter 2 mm.

(Original description in Latin) The shell is snow‑white and elongate, either straight or curved above, more or less to the right or to the left. It has 11–12 whorls, which are nearly flat and separated by a smooth suture. The body whorl is curved in the middle and rather short. The aperture is small and ovate, acuminate above. The columella is slightly thickened and reflected, and is joined to the outer lip by a thin callus. The outer lip projects at the middle and is not deeply sinuate near the suture.

== Distribution ==
This species occurs in the following locations:

- Angola
- Cape Verde
- Gulf of Guinea
- Saint Helena
- Senegal
- West Africa
