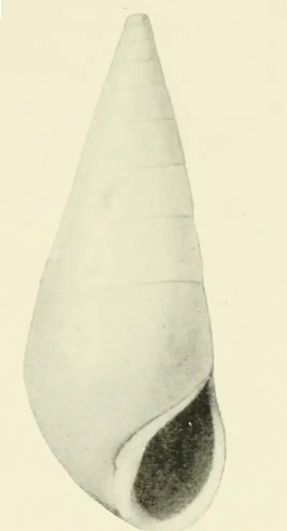
- Shell of Melanella baldra (holotype)

Scientific classification
- Kingdom: Animalia
- Phylum: Mollusca
- Class: Gastropoda
- Subclass: Caenogastropoda
- Order: Littorinimorpha
- Family: Eulimidae
- Genus: Melanella
- Species: M. baldra

Binomial name
- Melanella baldra Bartsch, 1917

Synonyms
- Melanella (Melanella) baldra Bartsch, 1917

= Melanella baldra =

Species of gastropod

Melanella baldra is a species of sea snail, a marine gastropod mollusk in the family Eulimidae. The species is one of many species known to exist within the genus, Melanella.

== Description ==
The length of the shell attains 5.1 mm, its diameter 2 mm.

(Original description) The shell is of medium size, broadly and regularly conical, and bluish-white. The first two whorls are well rounded, while the remaining whorls are nearly flat. The shell is decidedly appressed at the summit, polished, and marked only by exceedingly fine incremental lines. The basal portion of the preceding whorl shines through the substance of the succeeding whorl, giving the latter the appearance of having a double suture. The sutures are faintly marked. The periphery of the body whorl is feebly angulated, and the base is well rounded.

The aperture is very small and broadly oval, with an acute posterior angle. The outer lip is thick within but thin at the edge and is somewhat protracted in the middle. The inner lip is short and stout, being reflected over and appressed to the base anteriorly. The parietal wall is covered with a thick callus.

== Distribution ==
This species occurs in the Pacific Ocean off California (USA), Mexico and Costa Rica.
