= Melanella spina =

Scientific classification
- Kingdom: Animalia
- Phylum: Mollusca
- Class: Gastropoda
- Subclass: Caenogastropoda
- Order: Littorinimorpha
- Family: Eulimidae
- Genus: Melanella
- Species: M. spina

Binomial name
- Melanella spina (O. Boettger, 1893)

Species of gastropod

Melanella spina is a species of sea snail, a marine gastropod mollusk in the family Eulimidae.

== Description ==
(Original description in Latin) The shell is almost subrimate and distinctly depressed. It is turreted-conical, and curved to the right. It is very solid, white, extremely glossy, and polished. The spire is convex on the left side and somewhat concave on the right; it shows continuous, impressed varices. The apex is short, somewhat mucronate, and acute.

There are 12 nearly flat whorls, separated by a superficial, broadly appressed, and marginated suture. They increase rather rapidly in size and are much broader than they are high. The body whorl is very slightly angulate at the periphery and somewhat convex, with an obliquely steep base; it equals one third of the height of the shell.

The aperture is small, subvertical, and protrudes to the right; it is ovate. The peristome is somewhat thickened and blunt, with its margins joined by a callus. The right margin is slightly extended above the middle, while the columellar margin is concave and appressed.

== Distribution ==
The holotype of this marine species was found off the Philippines. The species occurs in the Indo-West Pacific; also off Japan, New Caledonia and Australia (Queensland) .
