= Melanella jacululum =

- Shell of † Melanella jacululum (original image)

Scientific classification
- Kingdom: Animalia
- Phylum: Mollusca
- Class: Gastropoda
- Subclass: Caenogastropoda
- Order: Littorinimorpha
- Family: Eulimidae
- Genus: Melanella
- Species: †M. jacululum

Binomial name
- †Melanella jacululum Maury, 1917

Synonyms
- † Balcis (Balcis) jacululum (Maury, 1917) superseded combination; † Eulima robusta Gabb, 1873 junior subjective synonym; † Melanella (Eulima) jacululum Maury, 1917; † Melanella astuta Pilsbry & C. W. Johnson, 1917 junior subjective synonym

Species of gastropod

Melanella jacululum is an extinct species of sea snail, a marine gastropod mollusk in the family Eulimidae.

== Description ==
The length of the shell attains 4.25 mm, its diameter 1.25 mm.

(Original description) The shell is small, slender, solid, and porcellanous in texture. It comprises approximately twelve whorls, with a width nearly double their height and flattened sides that slightly overhang the succeeding volutions. The suture remains distinct and transverse, leading to a rounded body whorl base. The aperture is small, featuring an outer lip that is thin, arcuate, and gently produced anteriorly. Faint traces of a rosy band are visible near the suture.

== Distribution ==
Fossils of this species were found in Oligocene strata in the Dominican Republic.
