= Melanella costellata =

- Shell of Melanella costellata (holotype)

Scientific classification
- Kingdom: Animalia
- Phylum: Mollusca
- Class: Gastropoda
- Subclass: Caenogastropoda
- Order: Littorinimorpha
- Family: Eulimidae
- Genus: Melanella
- Species: M. costellata

Binomial name
- Melanella costellata (Dautzenberg & H. Fischer, 1897)

Synonyms
- Eulima costellata Dautzenberg & H. Fischer, 1897 superseded combination

Species of gastropod

Melanella costellata is a species of sea snail, a marine gastropod mollusk in the family Eulimidae. The species is one of many species known to exist within the genus, Melanella.

== Description ==
(Original description in French) The shell is rather solid, narrowly elongate, and very glossy. The spire is straight, slender, and acuminate at the summit, composed of 9 whorls that are slightly convex and separated by a well-marked suture. With the exception of the first three, which are smooth, the whorls are adorned with numerous, closely spaced, flattened longitudinal costulae that are wider than the shallow grooves separating them. These costulae become obliterated on the body whorl, which occupies a little more than one-third of the total height. The aperture is ovate-piriform, angular at the summit, and rounded at the base. The columella is arched, thickened, and provided with an applied callosity. The outer lip is somewhat thickened, with a broadly sinuous profile at the summit. The coloration is glassy white; a more opaque decurrent band accompanies the suture on each side.

== Distribution ==
This species occurs in the Atlantic Ocean off the Azores
