= Melanella stamina =

Scientific classification
- Kingdom: Animalia
- Phylum: Mollusca
- Class: Gastropoda
- Subclass: Caenogastropoda
- Order: Littorinimorpha
- Family: Eulimidae
- Genus: Melanella
- Species: M. stamina

Binomial name
- Melanella stamina Dall, 1927

Species of gastropod

Melanella stamina is a species of sea snail, a marine gastropod mollusk in the family Eulimidae. The species is one of many species known to exist within the genus, Melanella.

== Description ==
The lengt of the shell attains 4.75 mm, its diameter 1.25 mm.

(Original description) The small shell is slender, white, smooth, and polished. It has flattened sides and an acute conical shape. The apex is minute and blunt, and the shell consists of about seven slightly flattened whorls. The suture is distinct and closely appressed, without being glazed over, and the whorls show no visible sculpture. The body whorl is less than half the total length of the shell, while the spire is straight. The base is elongately rounded and imperforate. The aperture is elongate and narrow, with thin margins; the outer lip is slightly convex and projects medially, whereas the inner lip is slightly raised and lacks an umbilical dimple.

== Distribution ==
This species occurs in the Atlantic Ocean off Florida, USA.
