= Melanella oleacea =

Scientific classification
- Kingdom: Animalia
- Phylum: Mollusca
- Class: Gastropoda
- Subclass: Caenogastropoda
- Order: Littorinimorpha
- Family: Eulimidae
- Genus: Melanella
- Species: M. oleacea

Binomial name
- Melanella oleacea (J. D. Kurtz & W. Stimpson, 1851)

Synonyms
- Eulima oleacea Kurtz & Stimpson, 1851

Species of gastropod

Melanella oleacea is a species of sea snail, a marine gastropod mollusk in the family Eulimidae. The species is one of many species known to exist within the genus, Melanella.

== Distribution ==
This marine species occurs off the Atlantic coast of the USA and off Puerto Rico and Jamaica.

== Description ==
The maximum recorded shell length is 12.7 mm.

(Original description in Latin) The shell is small, subulate, solid, and very glossy. It is white, or adorned with pale brown transverse bands. It has 12 whorls, which are flattened and contiguous. The suture is inconspicuous. The aperture is small and ovate.
