= Melanella densicostata =

- Shell of Melanella densicostata (holotype at MNHN, Paris)

Scientific classification
- Kingdom: Animalia
- Phylum: Mollusca
- Class: Gastropoda
- Subclass: Caenogastropoda
- Order: Littorinimorpha
- Family: Eulimidae
- Genus: Melanella
- Species: M. densicostata

Binomial name
- Melanella densicostata Bouchet & Warén, 1986

Species of gastropod

Melanella densicostata is a species of sea snail, a marine gastropod mollusk in the family Eulimidae.

== Description ==
The length of the shell attains 5.19 mm, its diameter is 1.42 mm.

== Distribution ==
This abyssal marine species occurs in the Bay of Biscay.
