= Melanella indica =

- Shell of Melanella indica (original image)

Scientific classification
- Kingdom: Animalia
- Phylum: Mollusca
- Class: Gastropoda
- Subclass: Caenogastropoda
- Order: Littorinimorpha
- Family: Eulimidae
- Genus: Melanella
- Species: M. indica

Binomial name
- Melanella indica (Preston, 1905)

Synonyms
- Eulima indica Preston, 1905

Species of gastropod

Melanella indica, is a species of sea snail, a marine gastropod mollusk in the family Eulimidae. The species is one of a number within the genus Melanella.

== Description ==
The length of the shell attains 6 mm, its diameter 2 mm.

(Original description) The shell is elongately fusiform, very solid, smooth, polished, and milky-white. There are 12 whorls, which are flattened. The suture is impressed, the aperture is oval, and the columella is curved.

== Distribution ==
This marine species was originally found off Sri Lanka.
