= Melanella spiridioni =

- Shell of Melanella spiridioni (original image)

Scientific classification
- Kingdom: Animalia
- Phylum: Mollusca
- Class: Gastropoda
- Subclass: Caenogastropoda
- Order: Littorinimorpha
- Family: Eulimidae
- Genus: Melanella
- Species: M. spiridioni

Binomial name
- Melanella spiridioni (Dautzenberg & H. Fischer, 1896)

Synonyms
- Eulima spiridioni Dautzenberg & H. Fischer, 1896 ·

Species of gastropod

Melanella spiridioni is a species of sea snail, a marine gastropod mollusk in the family Eulimidae. The species is one of many species known to exist within the genus, Melanella.

== Description ==
The length of the shell attains 4.5 mm, its diameter 1.5 mm.

(Original description in French) The shell is solid, smooth, and glossy. The spire is elongate, arcuate, and acuminate at the apex, composed of ten flat whorls, with the body whorl not reaching half of the total height. The aperture is small, oval, slightly angulate at the top, rounded at the base, and offset from the axis of the shell. The columella is arcuate, very narrow, and provided with a narrow, closely applied callus. The outer lip is sharp-edged and dilated, with a profile featuring a deep sinus at the top. The coloration is a subhyaline white.

== Distribution ==
This marine species occurs in the Atlantic Ocean off the Azores at a depth of 1557 m.
