= Melanella conoidalis =

- Drawing of a shell of Melanella conoidalis (original image)

Scientific classification
- Kingdom: Animalia
- Phylum: Mollusca
- Class: Gastropoda
- Subclass: Caenogastropoda
- Order: Littorinimorpha
- Family: Eulimidae
- Genus: Melanella
- Species: M. conoidalis

Binomial name
- Melanella conoidalis (G. B. Sowerby II, 1865)

Synonyms
- Balcis conoidalis (G. B. Sowerby II, 1865) (Balcis is considered a junior synonym of Melanella); Eulima conoidalis G. B. Sowerby II, 1865

Species of gastropod

Melanella conoidalis, common name the conical Eulima, is a species of sea snail, a marine gastropod mollusk in the family Eulimidae. The species is one of many species known to exist within the genus, Melanella.

== Description ==
(Original description) The shell is pyramidal, rather broad at the base, solid, white, and opaque. The whorls are flat, and the body whorl is rather angulated. The aperture is slightly angular, produced in front, and the varices are irregular.

== Distribution ==
This marine species occurs off Hawaii.
