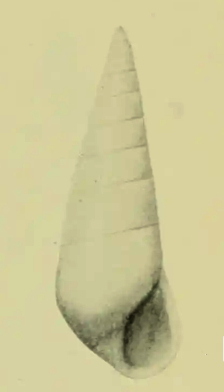
- Shell of Melanella lastra (original image)

Scientific classification
- Kingdom: Animalia
- Phylum: Mollusca
- Class: Gastropoda
- Subclass: Caenogastropoda
- Order: Littorinimorpha
- Family: Eulimidae
- Genus: Melanella
- Species: M. lastra

Binomial name
- Melanella lastra (Bartsch, 1917)

Synonyms
- Melanella (Balcis) lastra Bartsch, 1917 superseded combination

= Melanella lastra =

Species of gastropod

Melanella lastra is a species of sea snail, a marine gastropod mollusk in the family Eulimidae. The species is one of many species known to exist within the genus, Melanella.

== Description ==
The length of the shell attains 4.1 mm, its diameter 1.6 mm.

(Oroginal description) The small and conic shell is only very slightly flexed. It is bluish-white and semi-translucent, and it is polished, being marked by exceedingly fine lines of growth only. It probably has lost the first two whorls, retaining eight whorls. The first three whorls are well rounded and separated by a well-impressed suture, while the rest are very slightly rounded, with a scarcely defined suture. The periphery is well rounded, and the base is short and well rounded. The aperture is very broadly oval, with an acute posterior angle; the outer lip is decidedly protracted a little anterior to the middle; the inner lip is short, curved, reflected over, and appressed to the base; and the parietal wall is covered with a thick callus.

== Distribution ==
This species occurs off the Pacific coast of Lower California and Mexico.
