= Melanella zugnigae =

Scientific classification
- Kingdom: Animalia
- Phylum: Mollusca
- Class: Gastropoda
- Subclass: Caenogastropoda
- Order: Littorinimorpha
- Family: Eulimidae
- Genus: Melanella
- Species: M. zugnigae

Binomial name
- Melanella zugnigae Espinosa, Ortea & Magaña, 2001

Species of gastropod

Melanella zugnigae is a species of sea snail, a marine gastropod mollusk in the family Eulimidae. The species is one of many species known to exist within the genus, Melanella.

== Distribution ==
This marine species occurs in the following locations:

- Costa Rica
