= Melanella clavula =

Scientific classification
- Kingdom: Animalia
- Phylum: Mollusca
- Class: Gastropoda
- Subclass: Caenogastropoda
- Order: Littorinimorpha
- Family: Eulimidae
- Genus: Melanella
- Species: M. clavula

Binomial name
- Melanella clavula (A. Adams, 1861)

Synonyms
- Eulima clavula A. Adams, 1861

Species of gastropod

Melanella clavula is a species of sea snail, a marine gastropod mollusk in the family Eulimidae. The species is one of many species known to exist within the genus, Melanella.

== Description ==
The shell size is 3.5 mm

(Original description in Latin) The shell is acutely pyramidal, with the apex inclined backward. It has eight whorls, which are flattened and have margined sutures. The body whorl is broad, scarcely angulate at the periphery, and oblique at the base. The aperture is small, ovate, and effuse; the outer lip is thickened. The shell is milky white, somewhat solid, and opaque.

== Distribution ==
This species occurs in the Sea of Japan.
