= Melanella planisutis =

- Shell of Melanella planisutis (holotype at MNHN, Paris)

Scientific classification
- Kingdom: Animalia
- Phylum: Mollusca
- Class: Gastropoda
- Subclass: Caenogastropoda
- Order: Littorinimorpha
- Family: Eulimidae
- Genus: Melanella
- Species: M. planisutis

Binomial name
- Melanella planisutis Bouchet & Warén, 1986

Species of gastropod

Melanella planisutis is a species of sea snail, a marine gastropod mollusk in the family Eulimidae.

== Description ==
The length of the shell attains 3.01 mm, its diameter 0.84 mm.

== Distribution ==
This abyssal marine species occurs in the Atlantic Ocean off the Azores
