= Melanella decagyra =

- Shell of Melanella decagyra (original image)

Scientific classification
- Kingdom: Animalia
- Phylum: Mollusca
- Class: Gastropoda
- Subclass: Caenogastropoda
- Order: Littorinimorpha
- Family: Eulimidae
- Genus: Melanella
- Species: M. decagyra

Binomial name
- Melanella decagyra (Melvill & Standen, 1903)

Synonyms
- Eulima decagyra Melvill & Standen, 1903

Species of gastropod

Melanella decagyra is a species of sea snail, a marine gastropod mollusk in the family Eulimidae.

== Description ==
The length of the shell attains 2.75 mm, its diameter 1 mm.

(Original description in Latin) The very minute shell is white, polished, fusiform, heavily attenuated above. The shell contains 10 whorls The protoconch is obtuse, diaphanous and very shiny; the other whorls are flattened and polished. The body whorl is ovate toward the base and is somewhat solid. The aperture is small and ovate. The outer lip is a little thickened The columella is shiny. It is sloping and is angularly thickened at the base.

== Distribution ==
This marine species occurs in the Gulf of Oman.
