= Melanella perplexa =

- Shell of Melanella perplexa (original image)

Scientific classification
- Kingdom: Animalia
- Phylum: Mollusca
- Class: Gastropoda
- Subclass: Caenogastropoda
- Order: Littorinimorpha
- Family: Eulimidae
- Genus: Melanella
- Species: M. perplexa

Binomial name
- Melanella perplexa W. R. B. Oliver, 1915

Species of gastropod

Melanella perplexa is a species of sea snail, a marine gastropod mollusk in the family Eulimidae.

== Description ==
(Original description) The shell is subulate and tapered irregularly, featuring an acute apex. Its right side is nearly straight, though the apex is tilted to one side, while the left side is very slightly curved. There are 11 flat whorls, with a suture that is scarcely marked. The aperture is broadly ovate, having the outer lip produced laterally beyond the line of the spire, and further produced and expanded in front. Above the suture, a spiral line becomes visible.

The shell is smooth, white, shining, and translucent, measuring a height of 4.8 mm and a diameter above the aperture of 1.4 mm.

This presents a perplexing species, which is owing to the curious appearance of specimens across various ages of growth, all caused by the tilted apex being positioned at different angles to the aperture.

== Distribution ==
This marine species occurs off the Kermadec Islands and is endemic to New Zealand.
