= Melanella lactea =

- Shell of Melanella lactea(specimen at Naturalis Biodiversity center)

Scientific classification
- Kingdom: Animalia
- Phylum: Mollusca
- Class: Gastropoda
- Subclass: Caenogastropoda
- Order: Littorinimorpha
- Family: Eulimidae
- Genus: Melanella
- Species: M. lactea

Binomial name
- Melanella lactea (A. Adams, 1854)

Synonyms
- Eulima exlactea Sacco, 1892 junior objective synonym; Eulima lactea A. Adams, 1854 (original combination)

Species of gastropod

Melanella lactea is a species of sea snail, a marine gastropod mollusk in the family Eulimidae. The species is one of many species known to exist within the genus, Melanella.

== Description ==
(Original description in Latin) The shell is subulate, white, opaque, solid, and polished. The spire is straight, and the whorls are flat, furnished with continuous, impressed varices on the right side. The aperture is elliptical and somewhat produced anteriorly. The lip is slightly reflexed anteriorly; the outer lip is thickened.

== Distribution ==
This species has a wide distribution in the Indo-West Pacific; also off the Philippines, Indonesia, New Caledonia, Australia (Queensland)
