= Melanella brunnimaculata =

Scientific classification
- Kingdom: Animalia
- Phylum: Mollusca
- Class: Gastropoda
- Subclass: Caenogastropoda
- Order: Littorinimorpha
- Family: Eulimidae
- Genus: Melanella
- Species: M. brunnimaculata

Binomial name
- Melanella brunnimaculata (Kay, 1979)

Synonyms
- Balcis brunnimaculata Kay, 1979 superseded combination

Species of gastropod

Melanella brunnimaculata is a species of sea snail, a marine gastropod mollusk in the family Eulimidae. The species is one of many species known to exist within the genus, Melanella.

== Description ==
The length of the shell attains 3 mm, its diameter 1 mm.

== Distribution ==
This marine species occurs off Hawaii.
