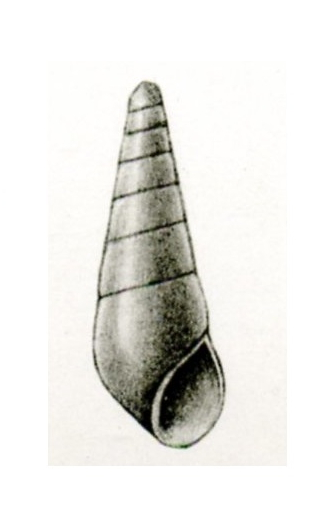
- Drawing of a shell of Melanella aethiopica

Scientific classification
- Kingdom: Animalia
- Phylum: Mollusca
- Class: Gastropoda
- Subclass: Caenogastropoda
- Order: Littorinimorpha
- Family: Eulimidae
- Genus: Melanella
- Species: M. aethiopica

Binomial name
- Melanella aethiopica (Thiele, 1925)

Synonyms
- Eulima aethiopica Thiele, 1925

= Melanella aethiopica =

Species of gastropod

Melanella aethiopica is a species of sea snail, a marine gastropod mollusk in the family Eulimidae. The species is one of many species known to exist within the genus, Melanella.

== Description ==
The shell measures 3.4 mm in height and 1.2 mm in diameter, while the height of the aperture is 1 mm.

(Original description in German) This small shell probably does not agree with any known species at the time of the original description. It is long‑conical, with a fairly large initial whorl, straight sides, and a moderately large aperture.

The whitish, translucent shell consists of 7½ whorls. The first whorl is rounded and relatively large, whereas the remaining whorls increase slowly and are flat. The body whorl is convex in the middle and rather flat below. The apertural margin is thickened, pressed against the columella, and projects forwards in a rounded curve on the right side, slightly below the middle. The aperture is long‑ovate and sharply angled above.

== Distribution ==
This species occurs in the Indian Ocean off Somalia, found at a depth of 693 m.
