= Melanella spinosa =

- Shell of Melanella spinosa (original image)

Scientific classification
- Kingdom: Animalia
- Phylum: Mollusca
- Class: Gastropoda
- Subclass: Caenogastropoda
- Order: Littorinimorpha
- Family: Eulimidae
- Genus: Melanella
- Species: M. spinosa

Binomial name
- Melanella spinosa W. R. B. Oliver, 1915

Species of gastropod

Melanella spinosa is a species of sea snail, a marine gastropod mollusk in the family Eulimidae.

== Description ==
(Original description) The shell is narrow and subulate, being slightly curved to the right, with the greatest curvature located near the apex. There are 10 flat whorls, featuring a distinct sutural line. The body whorl makes up about one-third of the total length of the shell. The aperture is narrowly ovate.

Inner Lip: The inner lip is thick, tapering posteriorly, and it extends right back to the suture, forming a distinct groove between itself and the body-whorl. The shell appears smooth, except for a single spiral line running just above the sutural line.

The colorof the shell is white and transparent, which allows the internal structure to be clearly visible through the shell walls.

The height of the shell attains 4.7 mm, and the diameter is 1 mm.

== Distribution ==
This marine species occurs off the Kermadec Islands and is endemic to New Zealand.
