= Melanella flexuosa =

Scientific classification
- Kingdom: Animalia
- Phylum: Mollusca
- Class: Gastropoda
- Subclass: Caenogastropoda
- Order: Littorinimorpha
- Family: Eulimidae
- Genus: Melanella
- Species: M. flexuosa

Binomial name
- Melanella flexuosa (A. Adams, 1854)

Synonyms
- Eulima flexuosa A. Adams, 1854 (original combination)

Species of gastropod

Melanella flexuosa is a species of sea snail, a marine gastropod mollusk in the family Eulimidae. The species is one of many species known to exist within the genus, Melanella.

== Description ==
(Original description in Latin) The shell is subulate-turreted, white, flexuous, solid, and subopaque. It has 15 whorls, which are flattened and marked by an impressed, somewhat translucent line at the sutures. The body whorl is rounded. The aperture is oblong; the outer lip has a flexuous margin and is produced in the middle.

== Distribution ==
This species occurs of the Philippines, Taiwan, Japan and French Polynesia.
