= Melanella siberutensis =

Scientific classification
- Kingdom: Animalia
- Phylum: Mollusca
- Class: Gastropoda
- Subclass: Caenogastropoda
- Order: Littorinimorpha
- Family: Eulimidae
- Genus: Melanella
- Species: M. siberutensis

Binomial name
- Melanella siberutensis (Thiele, 1925)

Synonyms
- Eulima siberutensis Thiele, 1925

Species of gastropod

Melanella siberutensis is a species of sea snail, a marine gastropod mollusk in the family Eulimidae.

== Description ==
The height of the shell is 6.25 mm, its diameter is 1.75 mm, and the height of the aperture is 1.5 mm.

(Original description in German) This shell is distinguished by a body whorl that is constricted below, together with a small, oblique aperture.

The shell is rather broadly conical, with a small, rounded, erect initial whorl. In fresh condition these shells are fairly strongly translucent. The 12–13 whorls are flat, but the suture is distinctly impressed, especially on the lower whorls. The width of the shell is much greater than its height—more than twice as great. The body whorl is fairly convex and narrows towards the base; correspondingly, the aperture is oblique and rather small, sharply angled above. The columellar margin is oblique and bears a weak callus above it, while the outer margin is broadly rounded..

== Distribution ==
This marine species occurs off Western Sumatra, Indonesia, found at a depth of 750 m.
