= Melanella corintonis =

Scientific classification
- Kingdom: Animalia
- Phylum: Mollusca
- Class: Gastropoda
- Subclass: Caenogastropoda
- Order: Littorinimorpha
- Family: Eulimidae
- Genus: Melanella
- Species: M. corintonis

Binomial name
- Melanella corintonis (Hertlein & A. M. Strong, 1951)

Synonyms
- Balcis corintonis Hertlein & A. M. Strong, 1951

Species of gastropod

Melanella corintonis is a species of sea snail, a marine gastropod mollusk in the family Eulimidae. The species is one of many species known to exist within the genus, Melanella.

== Distribution ==
This marine species occurs off Nicaragua and Ecuador.

== Description ==
The length of the shell attains 1.9 mm, its diameter 0.7 mm.

== Habitat ==
Minimum recorded depth is 22-24 m. The holotype was found on mangrove leaves.
