= Melanella salvadori =

Scientific classification
- Kingdom: Animalia
- Phylum: Mollusca
- Class: Gastropoda
- Subclass: Caenogastropoda
- Order: Littorinimorpha
- Family: Eulimidae
- Genus: Melanella
- Species: M. salvadori

Binomial name
- Melanella salvadori Castellanos, Rolán & Bartolotta, 1987

Synonyms
- Melanella salvatori [sic] (misspelling)

Species of gastropod

Melanella salvadori is a species of small sea snail, a marine gastropod mollusk in the family Eulimidae.

== Description ==
The length of the shell attains 6.5 mm, its diameter 2 mm.

== Distribution ==
This marine species occurs off Argentina.
