= Melanella kaiparaensis =

- Shell of Melanella kaiparaensis (holotype)

Scientific classification
- Kingdom: Animalia
- Phylum: Mollusca
- Class: Gastropoda
- Subclass: Caenogastropoda
- Order: Littorinimorpha
- Family: Eulimidae
- Genus: Melanella
- Species: †M. kaiparaensis

Binomial name
- †Melanella kaiparaensis (Laws, 1939)

Synonyms
- † Balcis kaiparaensis Laws, 1939 (superseded combination)

Species of gastropod

Melanella kaiparaensis is an extinct species of sea snail, a marine gastropod mollusk in the family Eulimidae.

== Description ==
The length of the shell attains 4.9 mm, its diameter 1.4 mm .

(Original description) The shell is small and elongate, with straight outlines, though some individuals show a tendency toward a slight curvature of the axis. The edge of the spire is quite even in profile, the sutures are very indistinct, and the whorls are quite flat. The apex is conical, consisting of about three lightly convex whorls that regularly increase in width, ending in a tip that is sharp and pointed. The body whorl is sub-angled at the periphery, flat above the periphery, and lightly convex on the base. The columella is fairly long, thin, slightly arcuate, and set vertically. The inner lip is very thinly callused. The outer lip is rounded over in fully adult shells, not thickened, and is broadly sinused behind and convex in front. The aperture is ovate-rotund. The height of the body whorl is less than one-third that of the shell.

== Distribution ==
Fossils of this species are endemic of New Zealand and were found in Tertiary strata in New Britain, Papua New Guinea..
