= Melanella shibana =

- Shell of Melanella shibana (original image)

Scientific classification
- Kingdom: Animalia
- Phylum: Mollusca
- Class: Gastropoda
- Subclass: Caenogastropoda
- Order: Littorinimorpha
- Family: Eulimidae
- Genus: Melanella
- Species: M. shibana

Binomial name
- Melanella shibana (Yokoyama, 1927)

Synonyms
- Eulima (Leiostraca) shibana Yokoyama, 1927 (original combination)

Species of gastropod

Melanella shibana is an extinct species of sea snail, a marine gastropod mollusk in the family Eulimidae.

== Description ==
The length of the shell attains 3.3 mm, its diameter 0.9 mm.

(Original description) The small shell is subulate. The 11 whorls are nearly flat except those near the apex which are slightly convex. They are polished and smooth and have indistinct sutures. The periphery is rounded. The base is convex. The aperture is ovate with the posterior corner acute. The outer lip is somewhat produced beyond a straight line on the apertural side of the shell.

== Distribution ==
Fossils of this marine species were found off Kuruma-cho, Japan
