= Melanella subula =

Scientific classification
- Kingdom: Animalia
- Phylum: Mollusca
- Class: Gastropoda
- Subclass: Caenogastropoda
- Order: Littorinimorpha
- Family: Eulimidae
- Genus: Melanella
- Species: M. subula

Binomial name
- Melanella subula (A. Adams, 1861)

Synonyms
- Eulima subula A. Adams, 1861

Species of gastropod

Melanella subula is a species of sea snail, a marine gastropod mollusk in the family Eulimidae. The species is one of many species known to exist within the genus, Melanella.

== Description ==
(Original description in Latin) The shell is awl-shaped, with a slightly twisted spire. It is white and semi-translucent, with the apex tinged with rose-pink. The shell has about eleven flattened whorls, the last of which is rounded at the periphery. The aperture is acuminate-ovate. The inner lip is scarcely reflected anteriorly, while the outer lip is produced in the middle.

== Distribution ==
This species occurs in the Chinese part of the Yellow Sea.
