= Melanella nisonida =

Scientific classification
- Kingdom: Animalia
- Phylum: Mollusca
- Class: Gastropoda
- Subclass: Caenogastropoda
- Order: Littorinimorpha
- Family: Eulimidae
- Genus: Melanella
- Species: M. nisonida

Binomial name
- Melanella nisonida (Melvill, 1906)

Synonyms
- Eulima nisonida Melvill, 1906 superseded combination

Species of gastropod

Melanella nisonida is a species of sea snail, a marine gastropod mollusk in the family Eulimidae.

== Description ==
The length of the shell is 6 mm and the width is 2 mm.

(Original description in Latin) The shell is spindle-shaped and somewhat trapezoidal. It is shiny, white, polished, and altogether very smooth and solid. It has 12–13 whorls, of which the two apical whorls are small and globular; the remaining whorls are slightly impressed at the sutures. A milky-white internal band is visible below, near the sutures, only spirally. The body whorl is angular at the periphery. The aperture is ovate, with the outer lip slightly thickened externally, and the columella is straight and produced at the base.

== Distribution ==
This marine species occurs in the Gulf of Oman.
