= Melanella ira =

Scientific classification
- Kingdom: Animalia
- Phylum: Mollusca
- Class: Gastropoda
- Subclass: Caenogastropoda
- Order: Littorinimorpha
- Family: Eulimidae
- Genus: Melanella
- Species: M. ira

Binomial name
- Melanella ira Dall, 1927

Species of gastropod

Melanella ira is a species of sea snail, a marine gastropod mollusk in the family Eulimidae. The species is one of many species known to exist within the genus, Melanella.

== Description ==
The lengt of the shell attains 4.6 mm, its diameter 1.3 mm.

(Original description) The minute shell is slender, and white. It contains about nine slightly convex whorls. Its apex is minute and rounded, and the surface is polished and devoid of sculpture, with the suture appearing glazed over. In the adult shell, the body whorl accounts for about one third of the total shell length. The aperture is ovate, with a moderately arcuate outer lip. The inner lip is callous and slightly raised, with a narrow depression immediately behind it. The base is rounded and slightly produced.

== Distribution ==
This species occurs in the Atlantic ocean off Florida and Georgia, USA.
