= Melanella junieri =

Scientific classification
- Kingdom: Animalia
- Phylum: Mollusca
- Class: Gastropoda
- Subclass: Caenogastropoda
- Order: Littorinimorpha
- Family: Eulimidae
- Genus: Melanella
- Species: M. junieri

Binomial name
- Melanella junieri Espinosa, Ortea & Magaña, 2006

Species of gastropod

Melanella junieri is a species of sea snail, a marine gastropod mollusk in the family Eulimidae.

== Description ==
The length of the shell attains 14 mm, its diameter 3 mm.

== Distribution ==
This marine species occurs in the Caribbean Sea off Costa Rica
