= Melanella richardi =

- Shell of Melanella richardi (original image)

Scientific classification
- Kingdom: Animalia
- Phylum: Mollusca
- Class: Gastropoda
- Subclass: Caenogastropoda
- Order: Littorinimorpha
- Family: Eulimidae
- Genus: Melanella
- Species: M. richardi

Binomial name
- Melanella richardi (Dautzenberg & H. Fischer, 1896)

Synonyms
- Eulima richardi Dautzenberg & H. Fischer, 1896 ·

Species of gastropod

Melanella richardi is a species of sea snail, a marine gastropod mollusk in the family Eulimidae. The species is one of many species known to exist within the genus, Melanella.

== Description ==
The length of the shell attains 7 mm, its diameter 2 mm.

(Original description in French) The shell is solid, smooth, and glossy. The spire is long, straight, and acuminate at the apex, composed of 12 flat whorls separated by a poorly defined suture. The body whorl is slightly convex and occupies scarcely more than one-third of the total height. The aperture is fairly ample, oval, slightly angulate at the top, and rounded at the base. The columella is rather thick and arcuate. The outer lip is dilated and sharp-edged, with a shallowly sinuous profile at the top. The coloration is a uniform white.

== Distribution ==
This marine species occurs in the Atlantic Ocean off the Azores at a depth of 1385 m.
