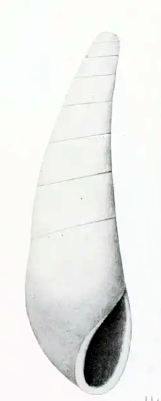
- Shell of Melanella falcata (original image)

Scientific classification
- Kingdom: Animalia
- Phylum: Mollusca
- Class: Gastropoda
- Subclass: Caenogastropoda
- Order: Littorinimorpha
- Family: Eulimidae
- Genus: Melanella
- Species: M. falcata

Binomial name
- Melanella falcata (P. P. Carpenter, 1865)

Synonyms
- Eulima falcata P. P. Carpenter, 1865

= Melanella falcata =

Species of gastropod

Melanella falcata is a species of sea snail, a marine gastropod mollusk in the family Eulimidae. The species is one of many species known to exist within the genus, Melanella.

== Description ==
The length of the shell (with the early whorls decollated) attains 7.6 mm, its diameter 2.2 mm.

(Original description) The bluish-white shell is very minute and it is doubly flexed, with the anterior portion turned to the right and the tip flexed backward.

The shell contains eight whorls. The first three whorls are well rounded and are separated by a well-impressed suture, while the rest are almost flat, separated by an inconspicuous suture and marked only by exceedingly fine incremental lines. The body whorl is inflated, with its periphery well rounded. The base is short and well rounded.

The aperture is broadly oval, with its posterior angle acute. The outer lip is thin and slightly protracted in the middle, while the inner lip is short and slightly curved, reflected over and appressed to the base. The parietal wall is covered by a rather thick callus.

== Distribution ==
This species occurs off the Pacific coast of Canada, USA, Mexico and Ecuador.
