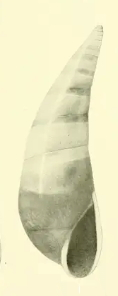
- Shell of Melanella grippi (original image)

Scientific classification
- Kingdom: Animalia
- Phylum: Mollusca
- Class: Gastropoda
- Subclass: Caenogastropoda
- Order: Littorinimorpha
- Family: Eulimidae
- Genus: Melanella
- Species: M. grippi

Binomial name
- Melanella grippi (Bartsch, 1917)

Synonyms
- Melanella (Balcis) grippi Bartsch, 1917 superseded combination

= Melanella grippi =

Species of gastropod

Melanella grippi is a species of sea snail, a marine gastropod mollusk in the family Eulimidae. The species is one of many species known to exist within the genus, Melanella.

== Description ==
The length of the shell attains 8 mm, its diameter 2.6 mm.

(Oroginal description) The elongate-conic shell is moderately stout, and is doubly flexed: the anterior portion is turned to the right, while the tip is bent backward. It is polished and marked by exceedingly fine lines of growth only, and it is milk-white in color, except where the dried animal slimes through the texture of the shell, where it appears yellowish-brown, or where varices cross the whorls, behind which there is always an opaque area.

The first five whorls are well rounded and separated by a somewhat constricted suture; the remainder are moderately rounded, a little more so on the convex side than on the concave. The summit of the whorls is appressed, the whorls being separated by a very ill-defined suture. The posterior termination shows conspicuously through the substance of the shell on the inside of the whorls and appears as a false suture. The last whorl is somewhat inflated, and its periphery is moderately protracted. The base is rounded. The aperture is ovate, with an acute posterior angle; the outer lip is protracted at the periphery; the inner lip is short, slightly curved, reflected, and appressed to the base; and the parietal wall is covered by a moderately thick callus. The varices of this species practically form a continuous oblique line running from the aperture almost to the tip.

== Distribution ==
This species occurs off the Pacific coast of Lower California and Mexico.
