= Melanella collator =

- Shell of † Melanella collator (holotype)

Scientific classification
- Kingdom: Animalia
- Phylum: Mollusca
- Class: Gastropoda
- Subclass: Caenogastropoda
- Order: Littorinimorpha
- Family: Eulimidae
- Genus: Melanella
- Species: †M. collator

Binomial name
- †Melanella collator (Laws, 1944)

Synonyms
- † Balcis collator Laws, 1944 (superseded combination)

Species of gastropod

Melanella collator is an extinct species of sea snail, a marine gastropod mollusk in the family Eulimidae. The species is one of a number within the genus Melanella.

== Description ==
The height of the shell attains 4.0 mm, and its diameter is 1.0 mm

(Original description) The shell is small and elongate-conic, with straight outlines. The first two or three whorls are lightly convex, while the remainder are flat, and the sutures are very indistinct. The height of the body whorl is less than one-third that of the shell, and its periphery is sub-angled. The aperture is subovate; the inner lip is narrowly but distinctly callused; the outer lip is thin, retrocurrent to the suture behind, and convex in front. The base is lightly convex.

== Distribution ==
Fossils of this marine species were found in Tertiary strata at Pakaurangi Point, Kaipara Harbour, New Zealand.
