= Melanella insculpta =

Scientific classification
- Kingdom: Animalia
- Phylum: Mollusca
- Class: Gastropoda
- Subclass: Caenogastropoda
- Order: Littorinimorpha
- Family: Eulimidae
- Genus: Melanella
- Species: M. insculpta

Binomial name
- Melanella insculpta Bouchet & Warén, 1986

Species of gastropod

Melanella insculpta is a species of sea snail, a marine gastropod mollusk in the family Eulimidae.

== Description ==
The length of the shell attains 3.64 mm, its diameter 0.91 mm.

== Distribution ==
This marine species occurs along the continental slopes of the North Atlantic Ocean.
