= Melanella versa =

Scientific classification
- Kingdom: Animalia
- Phylum: Mollusca
- Class: Gastropoda
- Subclass: Caenogastropoda
- Order: Littorinimorpha
- Family: Eulimidae
- Genus: Melanella
- Species: M. versa

Binomial name
- Melanella versa Dall, 1927

Species of gastropod

Melanella versa is a species of sea snail, a marine gastropod mollusk in the family Eulimidae. The species is one of many species known to exist within the genus, Melanella.

== Description ==
The lengt of the shell attains 4.5 mm, its diameter 1.5 mm.

(Original description) The small shell is transparent, and whitish, with obscure olivaceous nebulosities. It consists of about nine whorls and has a minute, blunt apex. The shell is dextrally and wholly arcuate, with a distinct suture that is not glazed over. Its surface is smooth and polished. The aperture is ovate, with an acute posterior commissure. The outer lip is strongly and arcuately produced, while the inner lip is short and thick, with the base evenly attenuated and imperforate. The body whorl measures about one-half of the total shell length.

== Distribution ==
This species occurs in the Atlantic Ocean off Florida, USA.
