= Melanella minutissimia =

Scientific classification
- Kingdom: Animalia
- Phylum: Mollusca
- Class: Gastropoda
- Subclass: Caenogastropoda
- Order: Littorinimorpha
- Family: Eulimidae
- Genus: Melanella
- Species: †M. minutissimia

Binomial name
- †Melanella minutissimia Garvie, 1996

Species of gastropod

Melanella minutissimia is an extinct species of sea snail, a marine gastropod mollusk in the family Eulimidae.

== Description ==
The length of the shell attains 1.5 mm.

== Distribution ==
Fossils of this species were found in Claibornian strata in Texas, USA
