= Melanella gradata =

- Shell of Melanella gradata (original image)

Scientific classification
- Kingdom: Animalia
- Phylum: Mollusca
- Class: Gastropoda
- Subclass: Caenogastropoda
- Order: Littorinimorpha
- Family: Eulimidae
- Genus: Melanella
- Species: M. gradata

Binomial name
- Melanella gradata (Cotton & Godfrey, 1932)

Synonyms
- Eulima gradata Cotton & Godfrey, 1932

Species of gastropod

Melanella gradata, common name the gradated eulima, is a species of sea snail, a marine gastropod mollusk in the family Eulimidae.

== Description ==
The length of the shell attains 5 mm, its diameter 2 mm.

(Original description) The shell is broad, sharply tapering, very thick, solid, very slightly curved, and comparatively short and stout. It is shining, polished, smooth, and opaque white. The protoconch is small and depressed, consisting of two rounded, flat-topped turns. There are nine adult whorls; the early whorls are flat, while the penultimate whorl becomes slightly convex. All the spire whorls are flattened horizontally at the sutures, giving them a bulbous appearance, though the actual suture is linear. The aperture is rather widely elongate-ovate; the outer lip is slightly excavated just below the suture, and the inner lip is slightly concave.

== Distribution ==
This marine species is endemic to Australia and occurs off South Australia and Western Australia.
