= Melanella elenensis =

- Shell of Melanella elenensis (holotype in the Smithsonian Institution)

Scientific classification
- Kingdom: Animalia
- Phylum: Mollusca
- Class: Gastropoda
- Subclass: Caenogastropoda
- Order: Littorinimorpha
- Family: Eulimidae
- Genus: Melanella
- Species: M. elenensis

Binomial name
- Melanella elenensis (Bartsch, 1924)

Synonyms
- Melanella (Balcis) elenensis Bartsch, 1924 superseded combination

Species of gastropod

Melanella elenensis is a species of sea snail, a marine gastropod mollusk in the family Eulimidae. The species is one of a number within the genus Melanella.

== Description ==
The length of the shell attains 4.5 mm, its diameter 1.2 mm

(Original description) The elongate-conic shell is slightly falciform, and bluish white. It contains 8.5 whorls. The whorls of the protoconch are decollated. The postnuclear whorls are appressed at the summit and very slightly rounded, forming an almost straight-sided spire. The suture is only slightly constricted. The periphery of the body whorl is well rounded, and the base is produced and evenly rounded. The entire surface is smooth and has a silky luster.

The aperture is suboval, with an acute posterior angle. The outer lip is thin and slightly contracted immediately below the posterior angle, but is scarcely produced anteriorly into a claw-like element. The inner lip is stout, very oblique, and reflected over and appressed to the base. The parietal wall is covered by a thin callus.

== Distribution ==
This marine species occurs off Ecuador.
