= Melanella ophiodon =

Scientific classification
- Kingdom: Animalia
- Phylum: Mollusca
- Class: Gastropoda
- Subclass: Caenogastropoda
- Order: Littorinimorpha
- Family: Eulimidae
- Genus: Melanella
- Species: M. ophiodon

Binomial name
- Melanella ophiodon Dall, 1927

Species of gastropod

Melanella ophiodon is a species of sea snail, a marine gastropod mollusk in the family Eulimidae. The species is one of many species known to exist within the genus, Melanella.

== Description ==
The lengt of the shell attains 3.5 mm, its diameter 1 mm.

(Original description) The minute shell is slender, thin, and translucent white. The apex is minute and blunt, while the spire is more or less arcuate and, in the type specimen, bends slightly to the right. The shell consists of about eight whorls, separated by a visible, appressed, and somewhat over-glazed suture. The surface is polished and shows no visible sculpture. The aperture is very short and somewhat patulous. The base is rounded and imperforate, and the margin of the aperture is thin and simple. The outer lip is slightly protractively arcuate.

== Distribution ==
This species occurs in the Atlantic ocean off Florida, USA.
