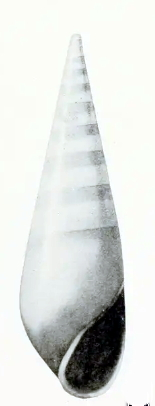
- Shell of Melanella mexicana (original image)

Scientific classification
- Kingdom: Animalia
- Phylum: Mollusca
- Class: Gastropoda
- Subclass: Caenogastropoda
- Order: Littorinimorpha
- Family: Eulimidae
- Genus: Melanella
- Species: M. mexicana

Binomial name
- Melanella mexicana Bartsch, 1917

Synonyms
- Melanella (Melanella) mexicana Bartsch, 1917 superseded combination

= Melanella mexicana =

Species of gastropod

Melanella mexicana is a species of sea snail, a marine gastropod mollusk in the family Eulimidae. The species is one of many species known to exist within the genus, Melanella.

== Description ==
The length of the shell attains 6.4 mm, its diameter 2 mm.

(Or!ginal description) The elongate-conic shell is straight, with a polished surface marked by exceedingly fine lines of growth and by scarcely perceptible microscopic spiral striations; its overall color is bluish-white. The shell contains 12 whorls. The whorls are flattened and are separated by an ill-defined suture. The basal portion of the preceding whorl shines through the succeeding turn, giving it the appearance of having a false suture. The periphery is well rounded, while the base is rather short and well rounded as well.

The aperture is moderately long and oval, with an acute posterior angle. The outer lip is thin and is decidedly protracted halfway between the posterior angle and the base. The inner lip is oblique and slightly curved, being reflected over and appressed to the base. The parietal wall is covered with a moderately thick callus.

== Distribution ==
This species occurs off the Pacific coast of California, Mexico and Costa Rica.
