= Melanella exilis =

- Shell of † Melanella exilis (original image)

Scientific classification
- Kingdom: Animalia
- Phylum: Mollusca
- Class: Gastropoda
- Subclass: Caenogastropoda
- Order: Littorinimorpha
- Family: Eulimidae
- Genus: Melanella
- Species: †M. exilis

Binomial name
- †Melanella exilis (Gabb, 1860)

Synonyms
- † Balcis exilis (Gabb, 1860) superseded combination; † Eulima exilis Gabb, 1860 superseded combination

Extinct species of gastropod

Melanella exilis is an extinct species of sea snail, a marine gastropod mollusk in the family Eulimidae.

== Description ==
The length of the shell attains 5.84 mm, its diameter 1.27 mm.

(Original description) The shell is elongate, slender, and polished. There are eight whorls, and the apex is acuminate. The aperture is small, and the outer lip is nearly straight.

== Distribution ==
Fossils of this species have been found in Claibornian strata in Texas, USA.
