= Melanella decipiens =

- Shell of Melanella decipiens (original image)

Scientific classification
- Kingdom: Animalia
- Phylum: Mollusca
- Class: Gastropoda
- Subclass: Caenogastropoda
- Order: Littorinimorpha
- Family: Eulimidae
- Genus: Melanella
- Species: M. decipiens

Binomial name
- Melanella decipiens (Hedley, 1899)

Synonyms
- Eulima decipiens Hedley, 1899

Species of gastropod

Melanella decipiens is a species of sea snail, a marine gastropod mollusk in the family Eulimidae.

== Description ==
The length of the shell attains 5 mm, its diameter 1.5 mm.

(Original description) The shell is small, straight and rather broa. It is translucent, and glossy, with a porcelain-white colour. The apex is mucronate. It consists of eleven whorls, which are scarcely rounded and show no sculpture. The suture is scarcely perceptible; what at first appears to be the suture, however, proves, under further magnification, to be the internal septa visible through the substance of the shell. The aperture is pyriform and oblique, with a callous, arched columella.

== Distribution ==
This marine species occurs off Funafuti, Tuvalu.
