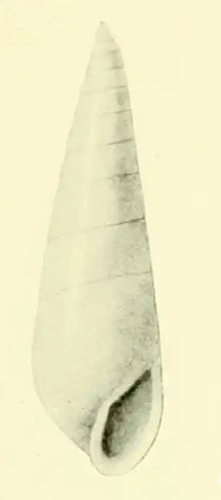
- Shell of Melanella townsendi (original image)

Scientific classification
- Kingdom: Animalia
- Phylum: Mollusca
- Class: Gastropoda
- Subclass: Caenogastropoda
- Order: Littorinimorpha
- Family: Eulimidae
- Genus: Melanella
- Species: M. townsendi

Binomial name
- Melanella townsendi Bartsch, 1917

Synonyms
- Melanella (Balcis) townsendi Bartsch, 1917

= Melanella townsendi =

Species of gastropod

Melanella townsendi is a species of sea snail, a marine gastropod mollusk in the family Eulimidae. The species is one of many species known to exist within the genus, Melanella.

== Description ==
The length of the shell attains 3.8 mm, its diameter 1.1 mm.

(Original description) The shell is small and straight, excepting the tip, which is flexed in one direction; it is semi-translucent and bluish-white. The shell contains 13 whorls. The first three whorls are well-rounded and separated by a well-impressed suture, while the rest are almost flat, with an inconspicuous suture. The periphery of the body whorl is rounded. The base is rather protracted, somewhat flat on the left side, and slightly tumid anteriorly. The aperture is broadly oval, with an acute posterior angle; the outer lip is thick at the edge and decidedly protracted in the middle; the inner lip is short, curved, reflected over, and appressed to the base; and the parietal wall is covered by a moderately thick callus.

== Distribution ==
This species occurs off the Pacific coast of Mexico and Panama.
