= Melanella halorhaphe =

- Shell of Melanella halorhaphe (original image)

Scientific classification
- Kingdom: Animalia
- Phylum: Mollusca
- Class: Gastropoda
- Subclass: Caenogastropoda
- Order: Littorinimorpha
- Family: Eulimidae
- Genus: Melanella
- Species: M. halorhaphe

Binomial name
- Melanella halorhaphe (Dautzenberg & H. Fischer, 1896)

Synonyms
- Eulima halorhaphe Dautzenberg & H. Fischer, 1896 ·

Species of gastropod

Melanella halorhaphe is a species of sea snail, a marine gastropod mollusk in the family Eulimidae. The species is one of many species known to exist within the genus, Melanella.

== Description ==
The length of the shell attains 10 mm, its diameter 2¾ mm.

(Original description in French) The shell is solid, smooth, glossy, elongate in form, and slightly arcuate and twisted toward the apex. The spire is composed of 12 to 13 flat whorls, with the body whorl being slightly convex, and they are separated by a very faint suture. The aperture is small but well open, oval, slightly offset from the axis of the shell, somewhat angulate at the top, and rounded at the base. The columella is narrow, thin, and slightly arcuate, provided with a narrow, closely applied, and well-delimited callus. The outer lip is sharp, and its profile is shallowly but broadly sinuous at the top. The coloration is an opaque, milky white.

== Distribution ==
This marine species occurs in the Atlantic Ocean off the Azores..
