= Melanella turbonilloides =

- Shell of Melanella turbonilloides (holotype at MNHN, Paris)

Scientific classification
- Kingdom: Animalia
- Phylum: Mollusca
- Class: Gastropoda
- Subclass: Caenogastropoda
- Order: Littorinimorpha
- Family: Eulimidae
- Genus: Melanella
- Species: M. turbonilloides

Binomial name
- Melanella turbonilloides Bouchet & Warén, 1986

Species of gastropod

Melanella turbonilloides is a species of sea snail, a marine gastropod mollusk in the family Eulimidae.

== Description ==
The length of the shell attains 2.33 mm, its diameter 0.79 mm.

== Distribution ==
This abyssal marine species occurs in the Atlantic Ocean off the Portugal and in the Bay of Biscay.
