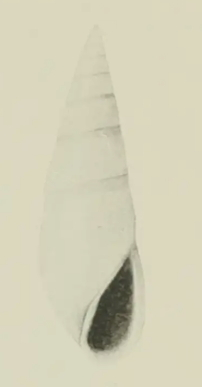
- Shell of Melanella halia (original image)

Scientific classification
- Kingdom: Animalia
- Phylum: Mollusca
- Class: Gastropoda
- Subclass: Caenogastropoda
- Order: Littorinimorpha
- Family: Eulimidae
- Genus: Melanella
- Species: M. halia

Binomial name
- Melanella halia (Bartsch, 1917)

Synonyms
- Melanella (Balcis) halia Bartsch, 1917 superseded combination

= Melanella halia =

Species of gastropod

Melanella halia is a species of sea snail, a marine gastropod mollusk in the family Eulimidae. The species is one of many species known to exist within the genus, Melanella.

== Description ==
The length of the shell attains 1.8 mm, its diameter 0.7 mm.

(Oroginal description) The very minute shell is translucent, showing the entire internal structure within. It is slightly flexed in one direction at the tip. The eight whorls are very evenly rounded and separated by a rather strongly marked suture; they are polished and without sculpture, excepting slightly impressed varicial streaks at irregular intervals. The periphery of the body whorl is well rounded. The base is short, slightly inflated, and well rounded. The aperture is small and oval, with an acute posterior angle; the outer lip is thin and slightly protracted in the middle; the inner lip is short, slightly curved, reflected over, and appressed to the base; and the parietal wall is covered by a moderately thick callus.

== Distribution ==
This species occurs off the Pacific coast of Lower California, Mexico and Ecuador.
