= Melanella soliduloides =

Scientific classification
- Kingdom: Animalia
- Phylum: Mollusca
- Class: Gastropoda
- Subclass: Caenogastropoda
- Order: Littorinimorpha
- Family: Eulimidae
- Genus: Melanella
- Species: M. soliduloides

Binomial name
- Melanella soliduloides (T. Habe, 1951)

Synonyms
- Balcis soliduloides T. Habe, 1951 superseded combination

Species of gastropod

Melanella soliduloides is a species of sea snail, a marine gastropod mollusk in the family Eulimidae.

== Distribution ==
This marine species occurs off Taiwan.
