= Melanella sororcula =

Scientific classification
- Kingdom: Animalia
- Phylum: Mollusca
- Class: Gastropoda
- Subclass: Caenogastropoda
- Order: Littorinimorpha
- Family: Eulimidae
- Genus: Melanella
- Species: †M. sororcula

Binomial name
- †Melanella sororcula (Wrigley, 1945)

Synonyms
- † Eulima sororcula Wrigley, 1945 superseded combination

Species of gastropod

Melanella sororcula is an extinct species of sea snail, a marine gastropod mollusk in the family Eulimidae. The species is one of a number within the genus Melanella.

== Distribution ==
Fossils of this species were found in Eocene strata in Great Britain.
