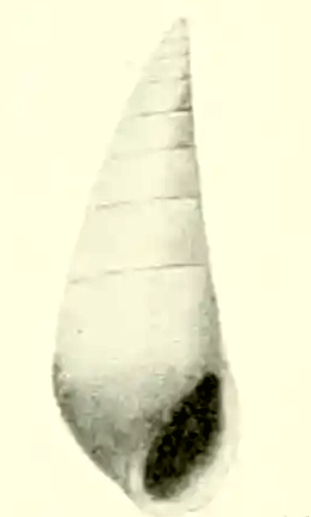
- Shell of Melanella cosmia (original image)

Scientific classification
- Kingdom: Animalia
- Phylum: Mollusca
- Class: Gastropoda
- Subclass: Caenogastropoda
- Order: Littorinimorpha
- Family: Eulimidae
- Genus: Melanella
- Species: M. cosmia

Binomial name
- Melanella cosmia Bartsch, 1917

Synonyms
- Melanella (Balcis) cosmia Bartsch, 1917 superseded combination

= Melanella cosmia =

Species of gastropod

Melanella cosmia is a species of sea snail, a marine gastropod mollusk in the family Eulimidae. The species is one of many species known to exist within the genus, Melanella..

== Description ==
The length of the shell attains 2.7 mm, its diameter 1 mm.

(Original description) The very small shell is broadly conical, and curved to the right. It is bluish white, semitranslucent, and polished. The first three whorls are well rounded and separated by a moderately constricted suture, whereas the remaining whorls are only slightly rounded and have a scarcely discernible suture.

The periphery of the body whorl is weakly angulate, and the short base is smoothly rounded. The aperture is very broadly ovate, with an acute posterior angle. The outer lip projects strongly forwards slightly anterior to the middle. The inner lip is curved, reflected over the base, and closely appressed to it, while the parietal wall is covered by a moderately thick callus.

== Distribution ==
This species occurs off the Pacific coast of Lower California and Mexico.
