= Melanella callistemma =

Scientific classification
- Kingdom: Animalia
- Phylum: Mollusca
- Class: Gastropoda
- Subclass: Caenogastropoda
- Order: Littorinimorpha
- Family: Eulimidae
- Genus: Melanella
- Species: M. callistemma

Binomial name
- Melanella callistemma Dall, 1927

Species of gastropod

Melanella callistemma is a species of sea snail, a marine gastropod mollusk in the family Eulimidae. The species is one of many species known to exist within the genus, Melanella.

== Description ==
The maximum recorded shell length is 5.7 mm, its diameter is 1.6 mm

(Original description) The shell is small, slender, white, and flat-sided. It has a blunt apex and about ten whorls. The suture is distinct and appressed. The sculpture consists of faint incremental lines and an occasional varicose stria. The base is rounded and imperforate. The aperture is subovate. The outer lip is thin, simple, and somewhat patulous, while the inner lip is short.

== Distribution ==
This species occurs in the Atlantic ocean off Florida, USA.

== Habitat ==
Minimum recorded depth is 538 m. Maximum recorded depth is 538 m.
