= Melanella mundula =

Scientific classification
- Kingdom: Animalia
- Phylum: Mollusca
- Class: Gastropoda
- Subclass: Caenogastropoda
- Order: Littorinimorpha
- Family: Eulimidae
- Genus: Melanella
- Species: M. mundula

Binomial name
- Melanella mundula (A. Adams, 1861)

Synonyms
- Eulima mundula A. Adams, 1861

Species of gastropod

Melanella mundula is a species of sea snail, a marine gastropod mollusk in the family Eulimidae. The species is one of many species known to exist within the genus, Melanella.

== Description ==
(Original description in Latin) The shell is subulate (awl-shaped) and tortuous; the spire is curved laterally. It has nine whorls, which are somewhat convex; the body whorl is ample and oblique at the base. The aperture is ovate and produced; the lip is thickened; the outer lip is arched and scarcely inflexed. The shell is milky white and subopaque.

== Distribution ==
This species occurs in the Sea of Japan.
