= Melanella patutahiensis =

Scientific classification
- Kingdom: Animalia
- Phylum: Mollusca
- Class: Gastropoda
- Subclass: Caenogastropoda
- Order: Littorinimorpha
- Family: Eulimidae
- Genus: Melanella
- Species: †M. patutahiensis

Binomial name
- †Melanella patutahiensis Marwick, 1931

Species of gastropod

Melanella patutahiensis is an extinct species of sea snail, a marine gastropod mollusk in the family Eulimidae. The species is one of a number within the genus Melanella.

== Distribution ==
Fossils from this species are endemic to New Zealand and were found in Tertiary strata in the Gisborne District.
