= Melanella mamilla =

- Shell of Melanella mamilla (holotype)

Scientific classification
- Kingdom: Animalia
- Phylum: Mollusca
- Class: Gastropoda
- Subclass: Caenogastropoda
- Order: Littorinimorpha
- Family: Eulimidae
- Genus: Melanella
- Species: M. mamilla

Binomial name
- Melanella mamilla (May, 1915)

Synonyms
- Eulima mamilla May, 1915

Species of gastropod

Melanella mamilla is a species of sea snail, a marine gastropod mollusk in the family Eulimidae.

== Description ==
The length of the shell attains 1.4 mm, its diameter 0.5 mm.

(Original description) The minute shell is gleaming white, and sharply pyramidal. It contains four and a half whorls, topped by a rounded, nipple-like apex. At the base, the shell opens into a wide, pear-shaped aperture The outer lip is expanded forward. The umbilical region is moderately excavated.

== Distribution ==
This marine species is endemic to Australia and occurs off Tasmania.
