= Melanella martynjordani =

- Shell of Melanella martynjordani (original image)

Scientific classification
- Kingdom: Animalia
- Phylum: Mollusca
- Class: Gastropoda
- Subclass: Caenogastropoda
- Order: Littorinimorpha
- Family: Eulimidae
- Genus: Melanella
- Species: M. martynjordani

Binomial name
- Melanella martynjordani (Jordan, 1895)

Synonyms
- Eulima martyni Kobelt, 1903 (unjustified emendation); Eulima martynjordani Jordan, 1895

Species of gastropod

Melanella martynjordani is a species of sea snail, a marine gastropod mollusk in the family Eulimidae.

== Description ==
The length of the shell attains 3.75 mm, its diameter 1 mm.

(Original description) The sub-cylindrical shell is thin, transparent, and glossy. The sculpture consists only of microscopic and irregular lines of growth, and the periphery is rounded. The color is a glassy white. The spire is straight, ending above in a blunt, rounded apex. There are seven to eight whorls, which are slightly convex, with the body whorl occupyies rather less than one-half of the entire length of the shell. The suture is rather oblique and well-defined; below it, there is a broad white band where the layers of the shell overlap. The aperture measures about a quarter of the total length, being broadly and regularly pyriform, as well as expanded and rounded below. The outer lip is prominent in the center and retreats above and below. The inner lip is slightly reflected over the short, oblique, and curved columella.

== Distribution ==
This marine species occurs off Norway.
