= Melanella tia =

- Shell of Melanella tia

Scientific classification
- Kingdom: Animalia
- Phylum: Mollusca
- Class: Gastropoda
- Subclass: Caenogastropoda
- Order: Littorinimorpha
- Family: Eulimidae
- Genus: Melanella
- Species: M. tia

Binomial name
- Melanella tia (Bartsch, 1926)

Synonyms
- Melanella (Balcis) tia Bartsch, 1926

Species of gastropod

Melanella tia is a species of sea snail, a marine gastropod mollusk in the family Eulimidae. The species is one of many species known to exist within the genus, Melanella.

== Description ==
The length of the shell attains 3.9 mm, its diameter 1.5 mm.

(original description) The shell is broadly conical, stout, thick, semitranslucent, and bluish white. The shell contains 7 1/2 whorls. The whorls of the protoconch are decollated. The early postnuclear whorls are slightly rounded, whereas the remaining whorls are flattened. The portion of each whorl that is appressed to the preceding whorl at the summit is bounded by a conspicuous line, giving the whorls a doubly suturate appearance. The suture is well marked.

The periphery of the body whorl is short, inflated, and well rounded. The base is short and well rounded. The aperture is oval, with an acute posterior angle. The outer lip is thin, while the inner lip is short and stout; it is reflected over and appressed to the base for two-thirds of its length. The parietal wall is covered by a moderately thick callus.

== Distribution ==
This species occurs off the Pacific coast of Ecuador.
