= Melanella stalioi =

Scientific classification
- Kingdom: Animalia
- Phylum: Mollusca
- Class: Gastropoda
- Subclass: Caenogastropoda
- Order: Littorinimorpha
- Family: Eulimidae
- Genus: Melanella
- Species: M. stalioi

Binomial name
- Melanella stalioi (Brusina, 1869)

Synonyms
- Eulima stalioi Brusina, 1869

Species of gastropod

Melanella stalioi is a species of sea snail, a marine gastropod mollusk in the family Eulimidae.

== Description ==
The length of the shell attains 7 mm, its diameter 2.5 mm.

(Original description in Latin) This shell is somewhat turret-shaped, slightly blunt, rather solid, and very glossy. It is ivory-white and semi-translucent. It has 8½ contiguous whorls, which are slightly flattened, with the last body whorl scarcely expanded and the sutures distinct. The aperture is large and oval, and the outer lip is straight and slightly blunt.

== Distribution ==
This marine species occurs in the Croatian part of the Adriatic Sea.
