= Melanella pulviscula =

Scientific classification
- Kingdom: Animalia
- Phylum: Mollusca
- Class: Gastropoda
- Subclass: Caenogastropoda
- Order: Littorinimorpha
- Family: Eulimidae
- Genus: Melanella
- Species: †M. pulviscula

Binomial name
- †Melanella pulviscula H.-J. Wang, 1982

Species of gastropod

Melanella pulviscula is an extinct species of sea snail, a marine gastropod mollusk in the family Eulimidae. The species is one of a number within the genus Melanella.

== Distribution ==
Fossils of this species were found in Cenozoic strata in Guangdong, China.
