= Melanella gracilis =

- Shell of Melanella gracilis (specimen at the Natural History Museum, Rotterdam)

Scientific classification
- Kingdom: Animalia
- Phylum: Mollusca
- Class: Gastropoda
- Subclass: Caenogastropoda
- Order: Littorinimorpha
- Family: Eulimidae
- Genus: Melanella
- Species: M. gracilis

Binomial name
- Melanella gracilis (C. B. Adams, 1850)

Synonyms
- Eulima gracilis C. B. Adams, 1850

Species of gastropod

Melanella gracilis is a species of sea snail, a marine gastropod mollusk in the family Eulimidae. The species is one of a number within the genus Melanella.

== Description ==
(Original description) The shell is ovate-conic and turrited. It is white, translucent, and opaque along the suture. The surface is smooth and shining, with an impressed spiral line immediately below the suture. The apex is acute, and the spire has nearly rectilinear outlines. There are thirteen whorls, which are slightly convex and separated by an indistinct suture. The body whorl gradually tapers anteriorly and is rather short. The aperture is rather narrow, and the outer lip is much advanced along the middle.

== Distribution ==
This marine species was originally found off Jamaica. It occurs in the Caribbean Sea off Florida; in the Gulf of Mexico; and off the Bahamas
