= Melanella tenua =

- Shell of Melanella tenua (original image)

Scientific classification
- Kingdom: Animalia
- Phylum: Mollusca
- Class: Gastropoda
- Subclass: Caenogastropoda
- Order: Littorinimorpha
- Family: Eulimidae
- Genus: Melanella
- Species: †M. tenua

Binomial name
- †Melanella tenua (Gabb, 1860)

Synonyms
- † Balcis tenua (Gabb, 1860) superseded combination; † Eulima tenua Gabb, 1860 superseded combination

Species of gastropod

Melanella tenua is an extinct species of sea snail, a marine gastropod mollusk in the family Eulimidae. The species is one of a number within the genus Melanella.

== Description ==
(Original description) The shell is very elongated and slender, consisting of nine rounded whorls separated by a distinct suture. The aperture is very small and oval in shape.

The shell measures 4.04 mm in length, with the body whorl measuring 0.63 mm in width. The aperture is 0.51 mm long.

== Distribution ==
Fossils of this species were found in Texas, USA.
