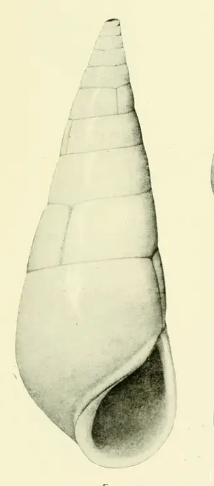
- Shell of Melanella dalli (original image)

Scientific classification
- Kingdom: Animalia
- Phylum: Mollusca
- Class: Gastropoda
- Subclass: Caenogastropoda
- Order: Littorinimorpha
- Family: Eulimidae
- Genus: Melanella
- Species: M. dalli

Binomial name
- Melanella dalli Bartsch, 1917

Synonyms
- Melanella (Melanella) dalli Bartsch, 1917 superseded combination

= Melanella dalli =

Species of gastropod

Melanella dalli is a species of sea snail, a marine gastropod mollusk in the family Eulimidae. The species is one of many species known to exist within the genus, Melanella.

== Description ==
The length of the shell attains 20 mm, its diameter 7.5 mm.

The large shell is straight, stout, and polished, with a milk-white colour and irregularly disposed varices. (The early whorls are decollated in both of our examined specimens), while the later whorls are slightly rounded and appressed at the summit. There are 10½ whorls remaining. The sutures are slightly constricted, and the base is short and well rounded. The aperture is oval, with an acute posterior angle. The outer lip is thin: immediately after leaving the summit, it bends slightly forward, then curves backward from the periphery, so that its basal portion lies behind the plane of the peripheral edge. The inner lip is short, moderately thick, curved, and slightly reflected over the base; the reflected portion merges with the thin parietal callus.

== Distribution ==
This species occurs off the Pacific coast of Lower California and Mexico.
