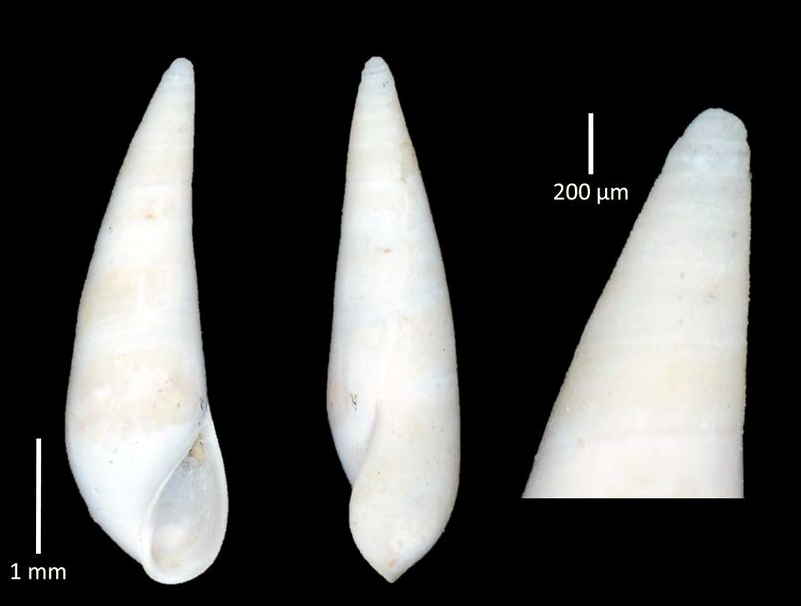
- Shell of Melanella catalinensis (paratype at the Smithsonian Institution)

Scientific classification
- Kingdom: Animalia
- Phylum: Mollusca
- Class: Gastropoda
- Subclass: Caenogastropoda
- Order: Littorinimorpha
- Family: Eulimidae
- Genus: Melanella
- Species: M. catalinensis

Binomial name
- Melanella catalinensis Bartsch, 1917

Synonyms
- Melanella (Balcis) catalinensis Bartsch, 1917 superseded combination

= Melanella catalinensis =

Species of gastropod

Melanella catalinensis is a species of sea snail, a marine gastropod mollusk in the family Eulimidae. The species is one of many species known to exist within the genus, Melanella..

== Description ==
The length of the shell attains 5.2 mm, its diameter 1.6 mm.

(Original description) The elongate-conic shell is slender, and doubly flexed, the principal flexure being turned to the right, while the extreme tip is slightly bent backward. It is bluish-white and polished. The first two whorls are well rounded and separated by a strongly constricted suture. The remaining whorls are moderately rounded on the convex side and only slightly rounded on the concave side of the spire; they are separated by a scarcely defined suture. The posterior limit of the whorls, however, shines through the substance of the shell and appears as a conspicuous false suture.

The periphery of the body whorl is slightly angulated. The base is moderately produced and well rounded. The aperture is oval, with an acute posterior angle. The outer lip is produced at the periphery, while the inner lip is somewhat sinuous, very oblique, slightly reflected, and appressed to the base. The parietal wall is covered with a thick callus.

== Distribution ==
The species occurs off the Pacific coast of California and Mexico.
