= Melanella pseudoglabra =

- Shell of Melanella pseudoglabra (original image)

Scientific classification
- Kingdom: Animalia
- Phylum: Mollusca
- Class: Gastropoda
- Subclass: Caenogastropoda
- Order: Littorinimorpha
- Family: Eulimidae
- Genus: Melanella
- Species: M. pseudoglabra

Binomial name
- Melanella pseudoglabra (Dautzenberg & H. Fischer, 1912)

Synonyms
- Eulima glabra Jeffreys, 1884 ·(secondary junior homonym of...); Eulima pseudoglabra Dautzenberg & H. Fischer, 1912 superseded combination; Melanella (Balcis) glabra (Jeffreys, 1884)

Species of gastropod

Melanella pseudoglabra is a species of sea snail, a marine gastropod mollusk in the family Eulimidae. The species is one of many species known to exist within the genus, Melanella.

== Description ==
The length of the shell attains 10 mm, its diameter 2¾ mm.

(Original description as Eulima glabra) The rather strong shell is awl-shaped,and semitransparent, and has a polished lustre. There is no sculpture. The colour is whitish, with a faint tinge of brownish-yellow.

The spire is shortish, ending in a blunt, bulbous point. There are 8 whorls, which are somewhat convex; the first whorl is inflected, and the body whorl occupies about half of the shell. The suture is nearly straight and well defined. The aperture is oval, proportionally large, acutangular [sharply angled] above, and rounded below; its length equals one-third that of the spire. The outer lip is flexuous. The inner lip is reflected on the columella at its base, but it is not observable on its upper part.

== Distribution ==
This marine species occurs in the Atlantic Ocean off the Azores and off the coast of West Africa.
