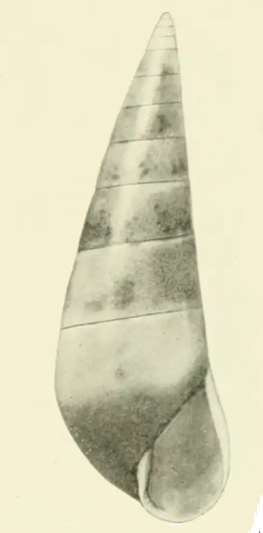
- Shell of Melanella berryi (original image)

Scientific classification
- Kingdom: Animalia
- Phylum: Mollusca
- Class: Gastropoda
- Subclass: Caenogastropoda
- Order: Littorinimorpha
- Family: Eulimidae
- Genus: Melanella
- Species: M. berryi

Binomial name
- Melanella berryi Bartsch, 1917

Synonyms
- Melanella (Balcis) berryi Bartsch, 1917

= Melanella berryi =

Species of gastropod

Melanella berryi is a species of sea snail, a marine gastropod mollusk in the family Eulimidae. The species is one of many species known to exist within the genus, Melanella.

This is a taxon inquirendum.

== Description ==
The length of the shell attains 6 mm, its diameter 2 mm.

(Original description) The elongate-conic shell exhibits a double flexure. When the specimen is viewed with the aperture facing forward, the first whorl is directed to the right, while the second flexure is directed backward. The clean shell is bluish-white, but when the animal has been allowed to dry within it, the shell assumes a brown coloration.

The shell contains 12 whorls. Thefirst two whorls are well rounded and are separated by a constricted suture. The remaining whorls are flattened and are marked by exceedingly fine lines of growth and very fine microscopic spiral striations. The sutures are scarcely perceptible. The posterior limit of the inner whorls can be seen through the mass of the shell and appears as a false suture.

The periphery of the body whorl is well rounded. The base is short and somewhat inflated anteriorly. The aperture is oblique and broadly oval, with a very acute posterior angle. The outer lip is strongly protracted between the base and the posterior angle, with its greatest extension occurring at the periphery. The inner lip is oblique and slightly sinuous; it is reflected over the base and appressed to it. The parietal wall is covered by a strong callus.

== Distribution ==
This species occurs in the Pacific Ocean off California (USA), Mexico and Costa Rica.
