= Melanella similis =

- Shell of Melanella similis

Scientific classification
- Kingdom: Animalia
- Phylum: Mollusca
- Class: Gastropoda
- Subclass: Caenogastropoda
- Order: Littorinimorpha
- Family: Eulimidae
- Genus: Melanella
- Species: †M. similis

Binomial name
- †Melanella similis (A. d'Orbigny, 1852)

Synonyms
- † Eulima similis A. d'Orbigny, 1852 superseded combination

Species of gastropod

Melanella similis is an extinct species of sea snail, a marine gastropod mollusk in the family Eulimidae. The species is one of a number within the genus Melanella.

== Description ==
The length of the shell attains 2.36 mm, its diameter 0.9 mm.

== Distribution ==
Fossils of this bathyal species were found in Western Europe.
