= Melanella aequatorialis =

Scientific classification
- Kingdom: Animalia
- Phylum: Mollusca
- Class: Gastropoda
- Subclass: Caenogastropoda
- Order: Littorinimorpha
- Family: Eulimidae
- Genus: Melanella
- Species: M. aequatorialis

Binomial name
- Melanella aequatorialis (Thiele, 1925)

Synonyms
- Eulima aequatorialis Thiele, 1925

Species of gastropod

Melanella aequatorialis is a species of sea snail, a marine gastropod mollusk in the family Eulimidae.

== Description ==
The shell measures 3 mm in height and 1.25 mm in diameter, while the height of the aperture is about 0.9 mm.

(Original description in German) This shell is somewhat similar to Parvioris innocens (Thiele, 1925), but the initial whorls are distinctly larger, as is the aperture.

The glossy shell is rather broadly conical and rounded below. It is formed of 8½ whorls that increase only slightly at first and then more rapidly; the whorls are somewhat convex. The first whorl is relatively large and high, while the body whorl is strongly convex and impressed at the umbilicus. The aperture is fairly straight and moderately broad, sharply angled above. The columellar margin is scarcely reflected, and the outer margin projects forwards in a rounded curve slightly below the middle..

== Distribution ==
This species occurs off Western Sumatra, Indonesia.
