= Melanella microsculpta =

- Shell of Melanella microsculpta (holotype at MNHN, Paris)

Scientific classification
- Kingdom: Animalia
- Phylum: Mollusca
- Class: Gastropoda
- Subclass: Caenogastropoda
- Order: Littorinimorpha
- Family: Eulimidae
- Genus: Melanella
- Species: M. microsculpta

Binomial name
- Melanella microsculpta Bouchet & Warén, 1986

Species of gastropod

Melanella microsculpta is a species of sea snail, a marine gastropod mollusk in the family Eulimidae.

== Description ==
The length of the shell attains 3.15 mm, its diameter 1.19 mm.

== Distribution ==
This abyssal marine species occurs in the Atlantic Ocean (south of Spain) and in the Mediterranean Sea.
