= Melanella guenteri =

Scientific classification
- Kingdom: Animalia
- Phylum: Mollusca
- Class: Gastropoda
- Subclass: Caenogastropoda
- Order: Littorinimorpha
- Family: Eulimidae
- Genus: Melanella
- Species: M. guenteri

Binomial name
- Melanella guenteri Engl, 2004

Species of gastropod

Melanella guenteri is a species of sea snail, a marine gastropod mollusk in the family Eulimidae. The species is one of many species known to exist within the genus, Melanella.

This species is mainly distributed throughout Antarctic waters.

== Description ==
The maximum recorded shell length is 5.2 mm.

== Habitat ==
Minimum recorded depth is 250 m. Maximum recorded depth is 305 m.
