= Melanella arleyi =

Scientific classification
- Kingdom: Animalia
- Phylum: Mollusca
- Class: Gastropoda
- Subclass: Caenogastropoda
- Order: Littorinimorpha
- Family: Eulimidae
- Genus: Melanella
- Species: M. arleyi

Binomial name
- Melanella arleyi Espinosa, Ortea & Magaña, 2001

Species of gastropod

Melanella arleyi is a species of sea snail, a marine gastropod mollusk in the family Eulimidae. The species is one of many species known to exist within the genus, Melanella.

== Distribution ==
This species occurs in the following locations:

- Caribbean Sea
- Costa Rica

== Description ==
The maximum recorded shell length is 3 mm.

== Habitat ==
Minimum recorded depth is 10 m. Maximum recorded depth is 12 m.
