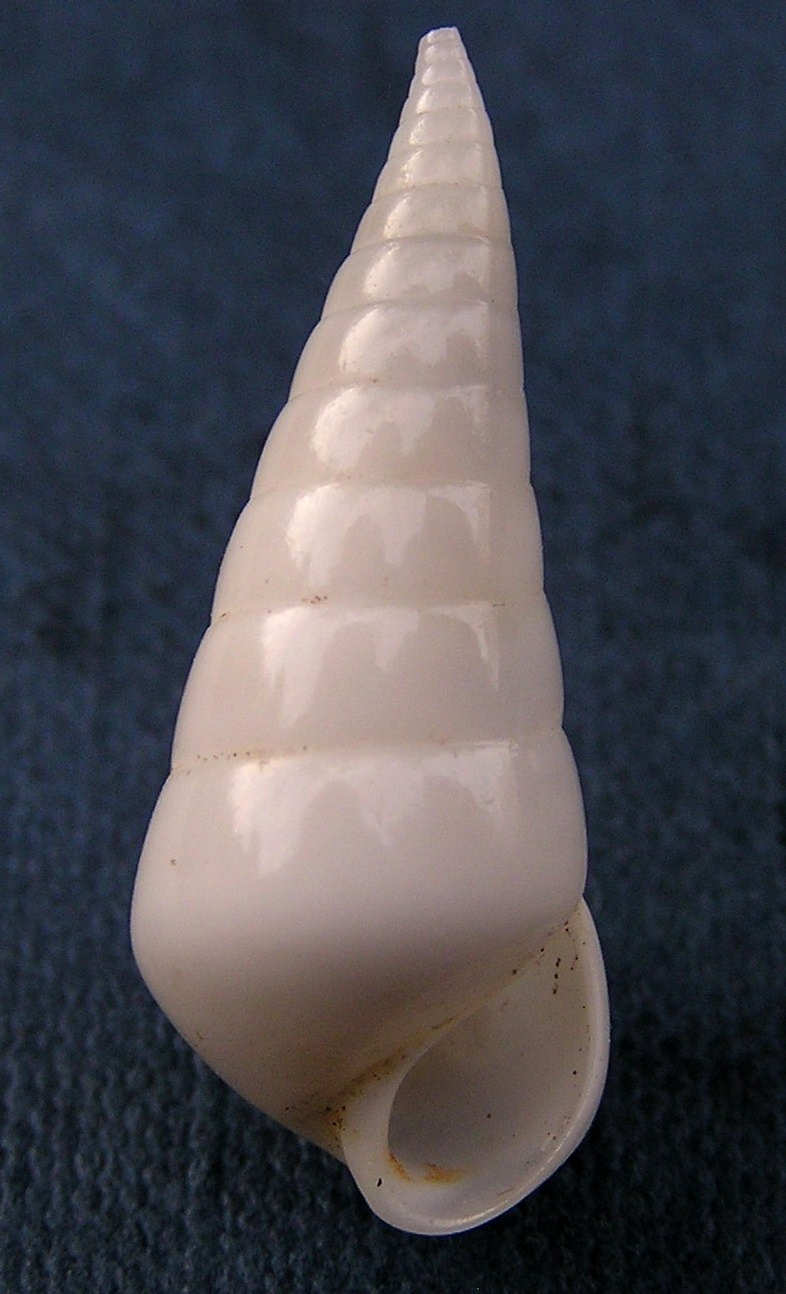
- Melanella candida

Scientific classification
- Kingdom: Animalia
- Phylum: Mollusca
- Class: Gastropoda
- Subclass: Caenogastropoda
- Order: Littorinimorpha
- Family: Eulimidae
- Genus: Melanella; Bowdich, 1822

Species
- See List of synonyms of Melanella

Synonyms
- Balcis Leach, 1847; Balcis (Balcis) Leach, 1847 junior subjective synonym; Euliamaustra Laseron, 1955; Eulima (Balcis); Eulimaustra Laseron, 1955; Melanella (Balcis) Leach, 1847; Melanella (Melanella) Bowdich, 1822

= Melanella =

Genus of gastropods

Melanella is a genus of very small ectoparasitic sea snails, marine gastropod molluscs or micromolluscs in the family Eulimidae.

== General characteristics ==
The shell is ovoid, with a distinctly elevated spire. The aperture is large, with its base somewhat produced and broadly rounded. The operculum is paucispiral, with a subspiral nucleus.

The genus comprises white, polished shells with a produced body whorl and an inner lip appressed to the attenuated base throughout its entire length, or at least along most of it. The shells may be either straight or flexed.

Melanella species are mostly ecto- and endoparasites on sea cucumbers and starfish. They can be host-specific or generalist.

== Species ==
The following species are recognised in the genus Melanella:

- Melanella abida Dall, 1927
- Melanella acanthyllis (R. B. Watson, 1883)
- Melanella acicula (A. Gould, 1849)
- Melanella acuformis (G. Nevill & H. Nevill, 1875)
- Melanella adamantina (de Folin, 1867)
- Melanella adiastalta Souza, Pimenta & J. Barros, 2021
- Melanella aequatorialis (Thiele, 1925)
- Melanella aethiopica (Thiele, 1925)
- Melanella aethria (Melvill, 1918)
- Melanella agulhasensis (Thiele, 1925)
- Melanella alba (da Costa, 1778)
- Melanella alertae (Dell, 1956)
- Melanella alfredensis Bartsch, 1915
- Melanella algoensis (E. A. Smith, 1901)
- Melanella amabilis (Brazier, 1877)
- Melanella amblia (R. B. Watson, 1883)
- Melanella amblytera (Verrill & Bush, 1900)
- Melanella ameliae Engl, 2007
- Melanella anachorea Dall, 1927
- Melanella anapetes Souza, Pimenta & J. Barros, 2021
- Melanella antarctica (Strebel, 1908)
- Melanella archeyi (Finlay, 1928)
- †Melanella arenularia (Gougerot in Perreau, 1969)
- Melanella arleyi Espinosa, Ortea & Magaña, 2001
- Melanella atlantica (E. A. Smith, 1890)
- Melanella attenuata (G. B. Sowerby II, 1866)
- Melanella aucklandica (Suter, 1909)
- Melanella augur (Angas, 1865)
- †Melanella badenia (Laws, 1939)
- Melanella baldra Bartsch, 1917
- Melanella becki (Turton, 1932)
- Melanella berryi Bartsch, 1917
- Melanella bicurvata (Chapman & Crespin, 1928)
- Melanella bipartita (Mörch, 1859)
- Melanella borealis (Bartsch, 1917)
- Melanella boscheineni Engl, 2004
- Melanella boscii (Payraudeau, 1826)
- Melanella bovicornu (Pilsbry, 1905)
- Melanella breviuscula (Dunker, 1875)
- Melanella brunnimaculata (Kay, 1979)
- Melanella bryani Pilsbry, 1918
- Melanella callistemma Dall, 1927
- Melanella candida (Marrat, 1880)
- †Melanella carinata Garvie, 2025
- Melanella catalinensis Bartsch, 1917
- Melanella chariessa (Verrill, 1884)
- Melanella chydaea (Watson, 1883)
- Melanella cifara Bartsch, 1915
- †Melanella claibornia K. van W. Palmer, 1937
- Melanella clavula (A. Adams, 1861)
- †Melanella collator (Laws, 1944)
- Melanella compacta (P. P. Carpenter, 1864)
- Melanella compactilis (Locard, 1891)
- Melanella conica (C. B. Adams, 1850) (taxon inquirendum)(possibly Vitreolina conica (C.B. Adams, 1850)
- Melanella conoidalis (G. B. Sowerby II, 1865)
- Melanella conoidea (Kurtz & W. Stimpson, 1851)
- Melanella convexa (E. A. Smith, 1907)
- Melanella corintonis (Hertlein & A. M. Strong, 1951)
- Melanella cosmia Bartsch, 1917
- Melanella costellata (Dautzenberg & H. Fischer, 1897)
- Melanella cumingii (A. Adams, 1854)
- Melanella cunaeformis (May, 1915)
- Melanella cuspidata (A. Adams, 1854)
- Melanella cyclopia Scuderi, Tisselli & Micali, 2022
- Melanella cylindrica (Thiele, 1925)
- Melanella dalli Bartsch, 1917
- Melanella debilis (A. Adams, 1861)
- Melanella decagyra (Melvill & Standen, 1903)
- Melanella decipiens (Hedley, 1899)
- Melanella densicostata Bouchet & Warén, 1986
- †Melanella deroeveri Beets, 1942
- †Melanella distorta (Defrance, 1823)
- Melanella doederleini (Brusina, 1886)
- Melanella draconis Bartsch, 1917
- †Melanella dubusi (Cossmann & Pissarro, 1902)
- Melanella dufresnii Bowdich, 1822
- Melanella eburnea (Megerle von Mühlfeld, 1824)
- Melanella elenensis (Bartsch, 1924)
- Melanella elsa Thiele, 1930
- Melanella eulimoides (C. B. Adams, 1850)
- Melanella exasperata (Preston, 1905)
- Melanella exilis (Pease, 1863) (accepted > unreplaced junior homonym, invalid; based on preoccupied original name)
- †Melanella exilis (Gabb, 1860)
- †Melanella extremis (Aldrich, 1911)
- Melanella exulata (E. A. Smith, 1915)
- Melanella falcata (Carpenter, 1865)
- Melanella fasciata (R. B. Watson, 1883)
- Melanella flexuosa (A. Adams, 1854)
- Melanella frielei (H. K. Jordan, 1895)
- Melanella gagei Bouchet & Warén, 1986
- †Melanella geoffreyi (Laws, 1936)
- Melanella glypta Bouchet & Warén, 1986
- Melanella gracilis (C. B. Adams, 1850)
- Melanella gradata (Cotton & Godfrey, 1932)
- Melanella grandis (A. Adams, 1853)
- Melanella gratiosa (Thiele, 1925)
- Melanella grippi (Bartsch, 1917)
- Melanella guenteri Engl, 2004
- Melanella hadalis Knudsen, 1964
- Melanella halia Bartsch, 1917
- Melanella halorhaphe (Dautzenberg & H. Fischer, 1896)
- Melanella hastata (G. B. Sowerby I, 1834)
- Melanella hebes (R. B. Watson, 1883)
- Melanella hemphilli Bartsch, 1917
- Melanella hians (R. B. Watson, 1883)
- Melanella hypsela (Verrill & K. J. Bush, 1900)
- Melanella ima Pilsbry, 1918
- Melanella indica (Preston, 1905)
- Melanella insculpta Bouchet & Warén, 1986
- Melanella iotoides Bartsch, 1916
- Melanella ira Dall, 1927
- †Melanella jacululum Maury, 1917
- Melanella jeffreysii (Tryon, 1886)
- †Melanella johnsoni G D. Hanna, 1924 (uncertain; unassessed)
- Melanella jucunda (Thiele, 1925)
- Melanella junieri Espinosa, Ortea & Magaña, 2006
- Melanella kahoolawensis Pilsbry, 1917
- †Melanella kaiparaensis (Laws, 1939)
- Melanella kanaka Pilsbry, 1917
- Melanella karolinae Engl, 2006
- Melanella kermadecensis W. R. B. Oliver, 1915
- Melanella kuronamako (Habe, 1952)
- Melanella lactea (A. Adams, 1854)
- †Melanella laevigata (H. C. Lea, 1843)
- Melanella lastra Bartsch, 1917
- Melanella laurae (Friele, 1886)
- †Melanella lautoides Finlay & Marwick, 1937
- Melanella letsonae Pilsbry, 1917
- Melanella levantina (Oliverio, Buzzurro & R. Villa, 1994)
- Melanella limata (Dall, 1927)
- Melanella lubrica (Monterosato, 1890)
- Melanella luchuana (Pilsbry, 1901)
- Melanella lucida (A. E. Verrill, 1884)
- Melanella luminosa B. A. Marshall, 1997
- Melanella lunata Pilsbry, 1918
- Melanella magnifica (Bartsch, 1915)
- †Melanella magnoliana J. A. Gardner & Aldrich, 1919 (uncertain > unassessed)
- Melanella major (G. B. Sowerby I, 1834)
- Melanella mamilla (May, 1915)
- Melanella maoria (Powell, 1940)
- Melanella martarum Souza, Asorey & Sellanes, 2024
- Melanella martinii (A. Adams, 1854)
- Melanella martynjordani (H. K. Jordan, 1895)
- Melanella marviva Espinosa, Ortea & Magaña, 2006
- Melanella maui (Dell, 1952)
- Melanella mexicana Bartsch, 1917
- Melanella micans (P. P. Carpenter, 1865)
- Melanella microsculpta Bouchet & Warén, 1986
- Melanella mimus Pilsbry, 1918
- Melanella minor (Pallary, 1904)
- †Melanella minutissimia Garvie, 1996
- Melanella modesta (Thiele, 1925)
- Melanella modesta (homonym) Thiele, 1930
- †Melanella monicensis Bartsch, 1917
- Melanella montereyensis Bartsch, 1917
- Melanella monterosatoi (Monterosato, 1890)
- Melanella muelleriae (Sturany, 1903)
- Melanella mundula (A. Adams, 1861)
- †Melanella musta (Yokoyama, 1928)
- Melanella myriotrochi Bouchet & Warén, 1986
- †Melanella necropolitana Bartsch, 1917 (uncertain, unassessed)
- Melanella nilae Engl, 2006
- Melanella nisonida (Melvill, 1906)
- Melanella obtusa (Laseron, 1955)
- Melanella obtusoapicata Bouchet & Warén, 1986
- Melanella ochsneri Bartsch, 1917
- Melanella odontoidea (A. Adams, 1861)
- Melanella ogasawarana (Pilsbry, 1905)
- Melanella oldroydae Bartsch, 1917
- Melanella oleacea (Kurtz & W. Stimpson, 1851)
- Melanella olssoni (Bartsch, 1924)
- Melanella opaca (G. B. Sowerby II, 1865)
- Melanella opalina (J. T. Marshall, 1901)
- Melanella ophiodon Dall, 1927
- Melanella orientalis Agamennone, Micali & Siragusa, 2020
- Melanella orphanensis A. H. Clarke, 1974
- Melanella orthophyes (Sturany, 1903)
- Melanella otagoensis (Powell, 1927)
- Melanella oxyacme (Suter, 1908)
- Melanella oxytata (R. B. Watson, 1883)
- Melanella pandata (A. Adams, 1861)
- Melanella paraabida Souza, Pimenta & J. Barros, 2021
- Melanella parallela Dall, 1927
- †Melanella parviapertura Landau, La Perna & Marquet, 2006
- †Melanella patutahiensis Marwick, 1931
- Melanella paxillus (Hedley, 1904)
- Melanella peninsularis Bartsch, 1917
- Melanella penna Dall, 1927
- †Melanella pepediazi Landau, La Perna & Marquet, 2006
- Melanella perplexa W. R. B. Oliver, 1915
- Melanella persimilis (Kuroda & Habe, 1971)
- Melanella petitiana (Brusina, 1869)
- †Melanella pinguicula (Chapman & Gabriel, 1914)
- Melanella pisinna Rehder, 1980
- Melanella planisutis Bouchet & Warén, 1986
- †Melanella plioiberica Landau, La Perna & Marquet, 2006
- Melanella polita (Linnaeus, 1758)
- †Melanella polygyra (Charlesworth, 1851)
- †Melanella pontilis P. A. Maxwell, 1992
- Melanella praecurta (Pallary, 1904)
- Melanella producta (P. P. Carpenter, 1863)
- Melanella pseudoglabra (Dautzenberg & H. Fischer, 1912)
- Melanella puhana (Dell, 1956)
- †Melanella pulviscula H.-J. Wang, 1982
- Melanella retexta (P. P. Carpenter, 1857) (taxon inquirendum)
- Melanella reticulata Bouchet & Warén, 1986
- Melanella retrorsa (G. B. Sowerby II, 1865)
- †Melanella retusa (Pezant, 1911)
- Melanella richardi (Dautzenberg & H. Fischer, 1896)
- Melanella robusta (A. Adams, 1861)
- Melanella roegerae (Cotton & Godfrey, 1932)
- Melanella salvadori Castellanos, Rolán & Bartolotta, 1987
- Melanella sankurieae Engl, 2004
- Melanella sansibarica (Thiele, 1925)
- Melanella sarissa (R. B. Watson, 1883)
- Melanella scarifata Gofas & Rueda, 2014
- †Melanella seguenzai Di Geronimo & La Perna, 1999
- †Melanella seymourensis Stilwell, Zinsmeister & Oleinik, 2004
- Melanella shibana (Yokoyama, 1927)
- Melanella siberutensis (Thiele, 1925)
- Melanella similior Bouchet & Warén, 1986
- †Melanella similis (d'Orbigny, 1852)
- Melanella solida (G. B. Sowerby II, 1865)
- Melanella solidula (A. Adams & Reeve, 1850)
- Melanella soliduloides (Habe, 1951)
- Melanella solitaria (E. A. Smith, 1915)
- †Melanella sororcula (Wrigley, 1945)
- †Melanella sowerbyi (Newton, 1891)
- Melanella spina (O. Boettger, 1893)
- Melanella spinosa W. R. B. Oliver, 1915
- Melanella spiridioni (Dautzenberg & H. Fischer, 1896)
- Melanella stalioi (Brusina, 1869)
- Melanella stamina Dall, 1927
- Melanella subantarctica (Strebel, 1908)
- †Melanella subemarginata (Deshayes, 1862)
- Melanella subula (A. Adams, 1861)
- †Melanella sulculata (Wrigley, 1945)
- Melanella tacomaensis Bartsch, 1917 (taxon inquirendum)
- Melanella tanabensis Takano, Tanaka & Kano, 2019
- Melanella teinostoma (A. Adams, 1854)
- †Melanella tenua (Gabb, 1860)
- Melanella teramachii (Habe, 1952)
- †Melanella texana K. van W. Palmer, 1937
- Melanella thalia Bartsch, 1915
- Melanella thersites (P. P. Carpenter, 1864)
- Melanella tia (Bartsch, 1926)
- Melanella tortuosa (A. Adams & Reeve, 1850)
- Melanella townsendi Bartsch, 1917
- Melanella translucens (Monterosato, 1890)
- Melanella trunca (R. B. Watson, 1897)
- Melanella truncata (Suter, 1908)
- Melanella turbonilloides Bouchet & Warén, 1986
- Melanella turrita Bouchet & Warén, 1986
- †Melanella tutamoensis Marwick, 1931
- Melanella variabilis (Schepman, 1913)
- Melanella vegrandis (Murdoch & Suter, 1906)
- Melanella versa Dall, 1927
- †Melanella waiaotea (Laws, 1941)
- †Melanella waikomitica (Laws, 1939)
- †Melanella wareni Landau, La Perna & Marquet, 2006
- Melanella yamazii (Habe, 1952)
- Melanella zugnigae Espinosa, Ortea & Magaña, 2001

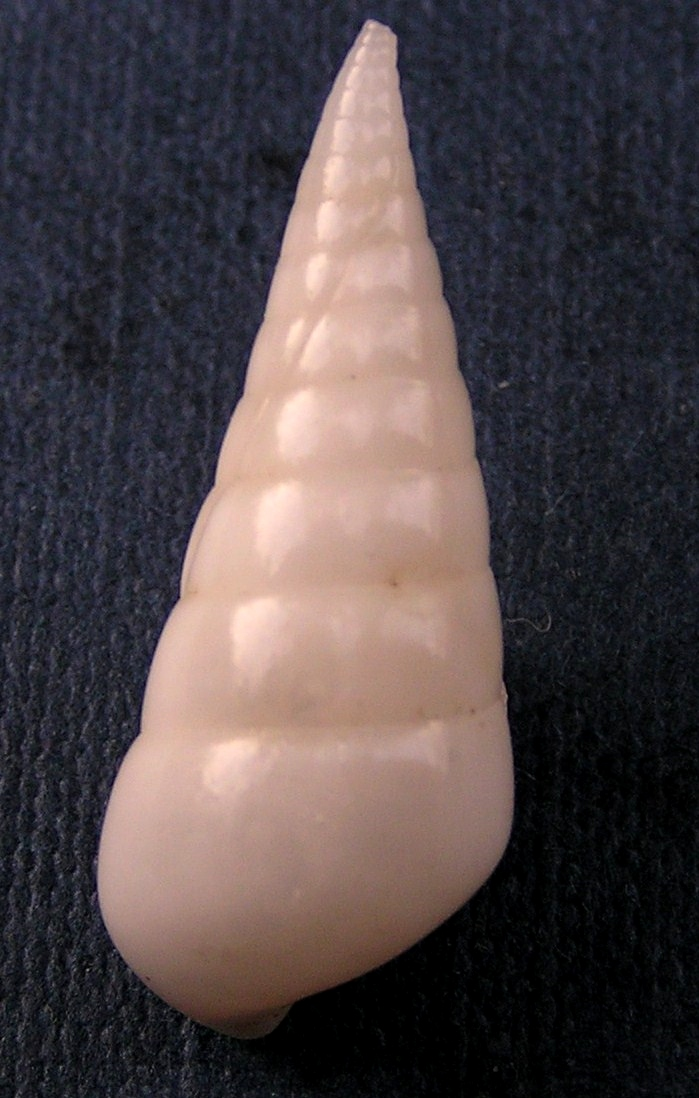
Melanella martinii, abapertural view

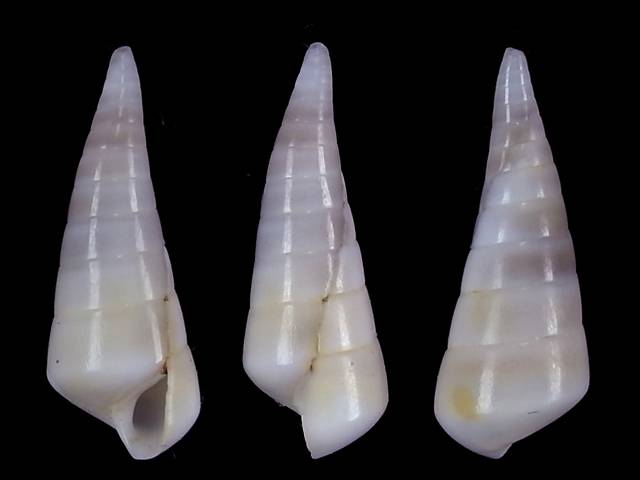
Three shells of Melanella solidula

The Indo-Pacific Molluscan Database also includes the following species with names in current use

- Melanella australiensis (Thiele, 1930)
- Melanella campyla (Watson, 1883)
- Melanella carneola (Gould, 1861 in 1859–61)
- Melanella curvata (A. Adams, 1861-b)
- Melanella dentaliopsis (A. Adams, 1861-b)
- Melanella flexa (A. Adams, 1861-b)
- Melanella labiosa (Sowerby II, 1834-b)
- Melanella nivea (A. Adams, 1861): species inquirenda
- Melanella oblonga (Boettger)
- Melanella reclinata (A. Adams, 1861)(uncertain > unassessed, use in recent literature not established by editor)
- Melanella scitula (A. Adams, 1861-b) (uncertain > unassessed, use in recent literature not established by editor)
- Melanella semitorta (A. Adams, 1861-b) (uncertain > unassessed, use in recent literature not established by editor)
- Melanella stenostoma (A. Adams, 1861-b)
- Melanella stylata (A. Adams, 1861-b)
- Melanella valida (A. Adams, 1861-b) (uncertain > unassessed, use in recent literature not established by editor)
- Melanella venusta (Pease, 1868-b)

== Synonyms ==
See List of synonyms of Melanella
