= Melanella claibornia =

Scientific classification
- Kingdom: Animalia
- Phylum: Mollusca
- Class: Gastropoda
- Subclass: Caenogastropoda
- Order: Littorinimorpha
- Family: Eulimidae
- Genus: Melanella
- Species: †M. claibornia

Binomial name
- †Melanella claibornia K. van W. Palmer, 1937

Species of gastropod

Melanella claibornia is a species of sea snail, a marine gastropod mollusk in the family Eulimidae. The species is one of a number within the genus Melanella.

== Distribution ==
Fossils from this species were found in Eocene (Claibornian) strata of the U. S. Gulf Coastal Plain.
