= Melanella retrorsa =

- Drawing of a shell of Melanella retrorsa (original image)

Scientific classification
- Kingdom: Animalia
- Phylum: Mollusca
- Class: Gastropoda
- Subclass: Caenogastropoda
- Order: Littorinimorpha
- Family: Eulimidae
- Genus: Melanella
- Species: M. retrorsa

Binomial name
- Melanella retrorsa (G. B. Sowerby II, 1865)

Synonyms
- Eulima retrorsa G. B. Sowerby II, 1865

Species of gastropod

Melanella retrorsa, common name the recurved Eulima, is a species of sea snail, a marine gastropod mollusk in the family Eulimidae. The species is one of many species known to exist within the genus, Melanella.

== Description ==
(Original description) The shell is solid, small, and narrow, pale fawn above, with the apex bent backward. The whorls are flat and rather straight. The aperture is small and oval-oblong, and the outer lip is rather thickened and nearly straight. <ref>Sowerby, G.B. II (1865–1866). Monograph of the genus Eulima. In: Conchologia iconica, or, illustrations of the shells of molluscous animals, vol. 15, pls. 1-6 and unpaginated text. London: Reeve & co. p. pl. 4.</ref

== Distribution ==
This marine species occurs off Society Islands.
