= Melanella orientalis =

- Shell of Melanella orientalis (holotype)

Scientific classification
- Kingdom: Animalia
- Phylum: Mollusca
- Class: Gastropoda
- Subclass: Caenogastropoda
- Order: Littorinimorpha
- Family: Eulimidae
- Genus: Melanella
- Species: M. orientalis

Binomial name
- Melanella orientalis Agamennone, Micali & Siragusa, 2020

Species of gastropod

Melanella orientalis is a species of sea snail, a marine gastropod mollusk in the family Eulimidae. The species is one of many species known to exist within the genus, Melanella.

== Distribution ==
This marine species occurs in the Aegean Sea. This species was suggested as possibly alien in the Mediterranean Sea.
