= Melanella monicensis =

- Shell of Melanella monicensis (holotype)

Scientific classification
- Kingdom: Animalia
- Phylum: Mollusca
- Class: Gastropoda
- Subclass: Caenogastropoda
- Order: Littorinimorpha
- Family: Eulimidae
- Genus: Melanella
- Species: †M. monicensis

Binomial name
- †Melanella monicensis Bartsch, 1917

Synonyms
- † Melanella (Melanella) monicensis Bartsch, 1917 alternative representation

Species of gastropod

Melanella monicensis is an extinct species of sea snail, a marine gastropod mollusk in the family Eulimidae.

== Description ==
The length of the holotype of the shell attains (without the early worls) 8 mm, its diameter 2.9 mm.

(Original description) The shell is elongate-conic, with a perfectly straight-sided spire. It is yellowish-white and polished, and is marked only by fine lines of growth. The whorls are decidedly flattened, and the suture is very poorly defined. The periphery of the body whorl is decidedly angulated. The base is short and well rounded. The aperture is rhomboid, with a decided angle at the junction of the outer and basal lips; the posterior angle is acute; the outer lip is thin; the inner lip is short, straight, and revolute; and the parietal wall is covered by a thin callus.

== Distribution ==
Fossils of this species were found off Santa Monica, California.
