= Melanella becki =

Scientific classification
- Kingdom: Animalia
- Phylum: Mollusca
- Class: Gastropoda
- Subclass: Caenogastropoda
- Order: Littorinimorpha
- Family: Eulimidae
- Genus: Melanella
- Species: M. becki

Binomial name
- Melanella becki Turton, 1932

Synonyms
- Eulima becki Turton, 1932

Species of gastropod

Melanella becki is a species of sea snail, a marine gastropod mollusk in the family Eulimidae. The species is one of many species known to exist within the genus, Melanella.
