= Melanella exasperata =

- Shell of Melanella exasperata (original image)

Scientific classification
- Kingdom: Animalia
- Phylum: Mollusca
- Class: Gastropoda
- Subclass: Caenogastropoda
- Order: Littorinimorpha
- Family: Eulimidae
- Genus: Melanella
- Species: M. exasperata

Binomial name
- Melanella exasperata (Preston, 1905)

Synonyms
- Eulima exasperata Preston, 1905

Species of gastropod

Melanella exasperata, is a species of sea snail, a marine gastropod mollusk in the family Eulimidae. The species is one of a number within the genus Melanella.

== Description ==
The length of the shell attains 3 mm, its diameter 1 mm.

(Original description) The elongately fusiform shell is dirty-white, and somewhat translucent. There are 10 whorls, which are smooth, shining, and rather flat, with the apical whorls being slightly curved. The suture is impressed, the peristome is simple, and the aperture is oval.

== Distribution ==
This marine species was originally found off Sri Lanka.
