= Melanella karolinae =

Scientific classification
- Kingdom: Animalia
- Phylum: Mollusca
- Class: Gastropoda
- Subclass: Caenogastropoda
- Order: Littorinimorpha
- Family: Eulimidae
- Genus: Melanella
- Species: M. karolinae

Binomial name
- Melanella karolinae Engl, 2006

Species of gastropod

Melanella karolinae is a species of sea snail, a marine gastropod mollusk in the family Eulimidae.

== Distribution ==
This marine species occurs in Antarctic waters off South Georgia and the Sandwich Islands.
