= Melanella adiastalta =

Scientific classification
- Kingdom: Animalia
- Phylum: Mollusca
- Class: Gastropoda
- Subclass: Caenogastropoda
- Order: Littorinimorpha
- Family: Eulimidae
- Genus: Melanella
- Species: M. adiastalta

Binomial name
- Melanella adiastalta L. Souza, Pimenta & J. Barros, 2021

Species of gastropod

Melanella adiastalta is a species of sea snail, a marine gastropod mollusk in the family Eulimidae. The species is one of a number within the genus Melanella.

== Distribution ==
This marine species occurs in the Atlantic Ocean off north-eastern Brazil.
