= Melanella cyclopia =

Scientific classification
- Kingdom: Animalia
- Phylum: Mollusca
- Class: Gastropoda
- Subclass: Caenogastropoda
- Order: Littorinimorpha
- Family: Eulimidae
- Genus: Melanella
- Species: M. cyclopia

Binomial name
- Melanella cyclopia Scuderi, Tisselli & Micali, 2022

Species of gastropod

Melanella cyclopia is a species of sea snail, a marine gastropod mollusk in the family Eulimidae.

== Description ==
The length of the shell attains 4 mm, its diameter 1.67 mm.

== Distribution ==
This marine species occurs off Sicily in the Ionian Sea.
