= Melanella debilis =

Scientific classification
- Kingdom: Animalia
- Phylum: Mollusca
- Class: Gastropoda
- Subclass: Caenogastropoda
- Order: Littorinimorpha
- Family: Eulimidae
- Genus: Melanella
- Species: M. debilis

Binomial name
- Melanella debilis (A. Adams, 1861)

Synonyms
- Eulima debilis A. Adams, 1861

Species of gastropod

Melanella debilis is a species of sea snail, a marine gastropod mollusk in the family Eulimidae. The species is one of many species known to exist within the genus, Melanella.

== Description ==
(Original description in Latin) The shell is short and subulate, and it is straight. It has seven whorls, which are flattened; the body whorl is elongate and dilated at the base. The aperture is ovate; the outer lip is thin and scarcely curved; the outer lip has a produced and arched margin. The shell is semipellucid, thin, and glassy in texture.

== Distribution ==
This species occurs in the Sea of Japan.
