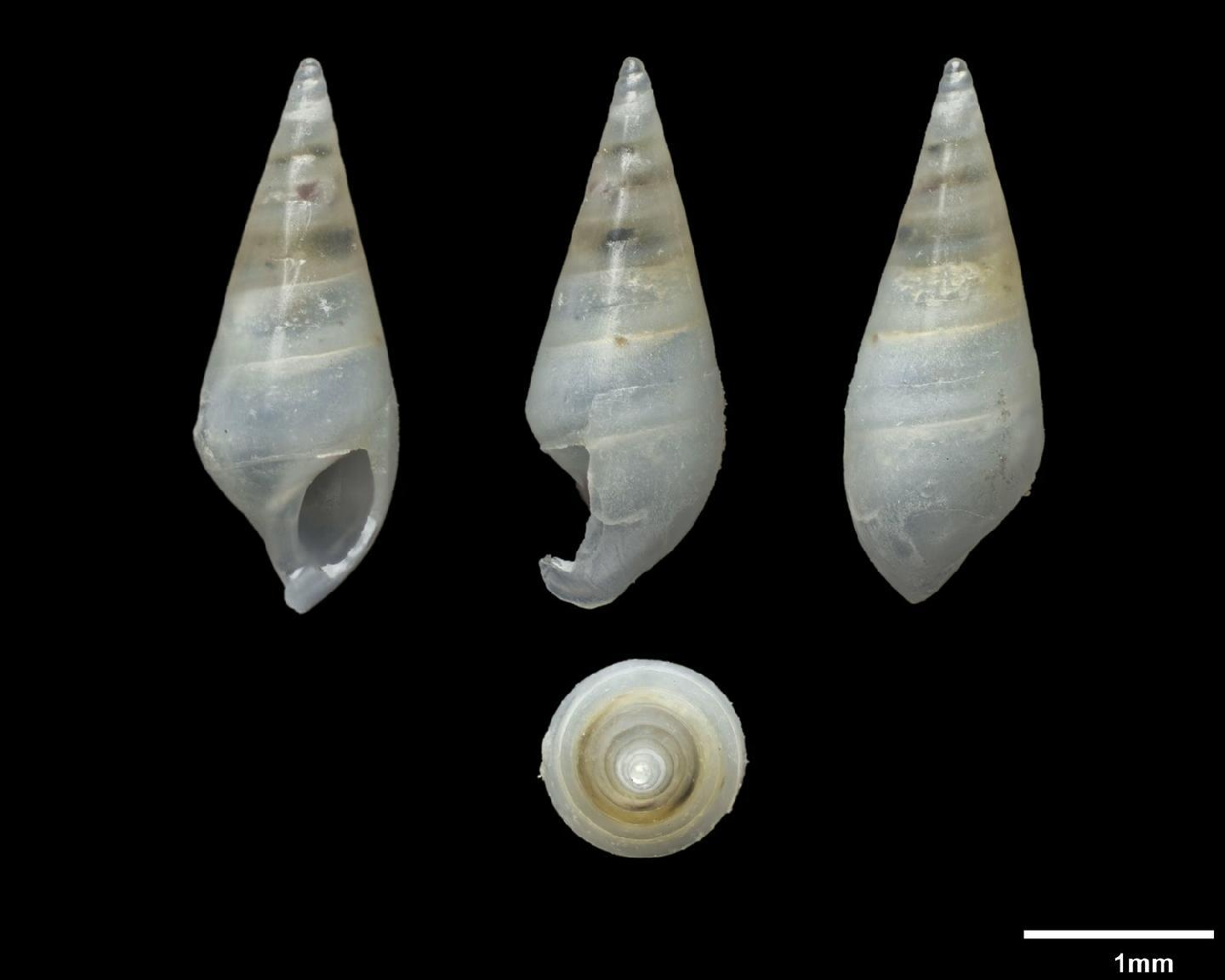
- Shell of Melanella producta (specimen at the Natural History Museum, London)

Scientific classification
- Kingdom: Animalia
- Phylum: Mollusca
- Class: Gastropoda
- Subclass: Caenogastropoda
- Order: Littorinimorpha
- Family: Eulimidae
- Genus: Melanella
- Species: M. producta

Binomial name
- Melanella producta (P. P. Carpenter, 1863)

Synonyms
- Leiostraca producta P. P. Carpenter, 1865 superseded combination

= Melanella producta =

Species of gastropod

Melanella producta is a species of sea snail, a marine gastropod mollusk in the family Eulimidae. The species is one of many species known to exist within the genus, Melanella.

== Taxonomy ==
This is not a replacement name as suggested by Warén & Crossland, 1991: explicitly described as a new species and stated as having been misidentified by Carpenter (1857) as Leiostraca solitaria C.B. Adams, 1852

== Description ==
(Original description by Carpenter) "One nearly perfect shell and some fragments answer to the description of this species. It differs from Leiostraca iota var. retexta, in being larger, broader, flatter, with the whorls in different proportion.

"Leiostraca solitaria agrees in shape with the unique Panama shell, whorl for whorl; but its base and outer lip are much more produced anteriorly. For this reason, it may be known as Leiostraca producta."

== Distribution ==
This species occurs off the Pacific coast of Mexico and Panama.
