= Melanella roegerae =

- Shell of Melanella roegerae (original image)

Scientific classification
- Kingdom: Animalia
- Phylum: Mollusca
- Class: Gastropoda
- Subclass: Caenogastropoda
- Order: Littorinimorpha
- Family: Eulimidae
- Genus: Melanella
- Species: M. roegerae

Binomial name
- Melanella roegerae (Cotton & Godfrey, 1932)

Synonyms
- Eulima roegerae Cotton & Godfrey, 1932

Species of sea snail

Melanella roegerae, common name the Roeger's eulima, is a species of sea snail, a marine gastropod mollusk in the family Eulimidae.

== Description ==
The length of the shell attains 14 mm, its diameter 3.5 mm.

(Original description) The shell is elongate, pyramidal, solid, shining, smooth, and opaque white, except for exceedingly fine lines of growth. The protoconch is small, oblique, smooth, and consists of two whorls. There are eleven adult whorls, which are very slightly convex, with the body whorl being rather small; the base is smooth. The suture is narrow, margined, and not impressed. The aperture is pyriform; the outer lip is acute and a little produced anteriorly, while the inner lip is reflexed and narrow.

== Distribution ==
This marine species is endemic to Australia and occurs off South Australia.
