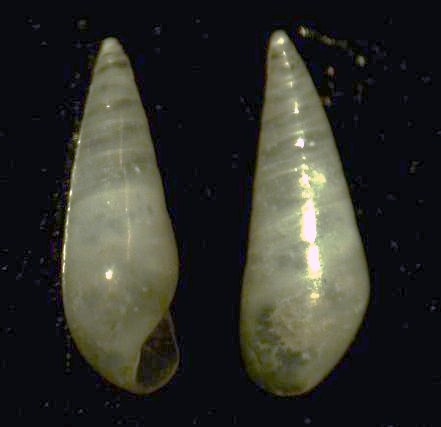
- Two shells of Eulima algoensis

Scientific classification
- Kingdom: Animalia
- Phylum: Mollusca
- Class: Gastropoda
- Subclass: Caenogastropoda
- Order: Littorinimorpha
- Superfamily: Vanikoroidea
- Family: Eulimidae
- Genus: Eulima; Risso, 1826

Type species
- Turbo subulatus Donovan, 1804

Synonyms
- Cuspeulima Laseron, 1955; Eulima (Leiostraca); Eulima (Subularia); Leiostraca H. Adams & A. Adams, 1853; Melania (Eulima) Risso, 1826; Strombiformis Da Costa, 1778 (Invalid: placed on the Official Index by ICZN Opinion 1718); Subularia Monterosato, 1884

= Eulima =

Genus of gastropods

Eulima is a genus of small, ectoparasitic sea snails, marine gastropod mollusks in the family Eulimidae.

Eulima is the type genus of the family Eulimidae.

== Description ==
The genus appeared early in the Secondary and became abundant in forms during the Tertiary period.

The shell is in the form of an elongated, towering spiral, which tapers to a fine point. The aperture is ovate and entire with the peristome incomplete behind. The outer lip is thick and even.

According to George Washington Tryon's Manual of Conchology:

The imperforate shell is subulate, many-whorled, polished, and porcellanous Its spire is usually curved or twisted to one side, bearing on one side only, a series of varices forming ribs internally and marking the position of successive mouths. The apex is acute. The aperture is oval, entire, pointed above, rounded below. The lip is simple and a little thickened. The columellar margin is reflected. The operculum is corneous and pancispiral. Its nucleus is near the inner lip.

The animal shows subulate tentacles, approaching at the base. The eyes are large and nearly sessile. The foot is truncated in front. The foot of Eulima secretes a mucous filament which assists to sustain it in the water. The mentum is bilobed. The opercular lobe is winged on each side. The branchial plume is single.

== Species ==
Species within the genus Eulima include:

- Eulima acerrima (R. B. Watson, 1883) (taxon inquirendum)
- Eulima acicularis (A. Adams, 1861)
- Eulima aclis (A. Adams, 1851) (taxon inquirendum)
- Eulima acutissima (Sowerby, 1866)
- Eulima adamsii (Sowerby, 1866) (taxon inquirendum)
- Eulima agulhasensis (J. Thiele, 1925)
- Eulima alaskensis (P. Bartsch, 1917)
- Eulima albanyana (W. Turton, 1932)
- Eulima albida (P. Marshall, 1902)
- Eulima almo (P. Bartsch, 1917)
- Eulima amanda (J. Thiele, 1925)
- Eulima amblia (R. B. Watson, 1883)
- Eulima angulosa (F. P. Jousseaume in Fisher-Piette & Nicklès, 1946)
- Eulima angustior (Monterosato fide Paetel, 1887)
- Eulima anonyma, Bouchet & Warén, 1986
- Eulima arcuata, C. B. Adams, 1850: synonym of Vitreolina arcuata (C. B. Adams, 1850)
- Eulima atypha Verrill & Bush, 1900
- Eulima augustoi Nobre, 1937 (taxon inquirendum)
- Eulima australasica Melvill & Standen, 1899
- Eulima badia Watson, 1897
- Eulima balteata (A. Adams, 1864)
- Eulima barthelowi (Bartsch, 1917)
- Eulima bifascialis (A. Adams, 1864)
- Eulima bifasciata d'Orbigny, 1841
- Eulima bilineata Alder, 1848
- Eulima bipartita Mörch, 1860
- Eulima bivittata (H. Adams & A. Adams, 1853)
- Eulima bizona (A. Adams, 1864)
- † Eulima boucheti Landau, La Perna & Marquet, 2006
- Eulima breviuscula Dunker, 1875
- Eulima broadbentae (Cotton & Godfrey, 1932)
- Eulima campyla Watson, 1883 (taxon inquirendum)
- Eulima capillastericola Bartsch, 1909 (taxon inquirendum)
- Eulima carolii Dall, 1889 (nomen dubium)
- Eulima chascanon Watson, 1883
- Eulima chaunax Watson, 1883 (taxon inquirendum)
- Eulima chionea Bouchet & Warén, 1986
- Eulima chyta Watson, 1883
- Eulima cinctella (A. Adams, 1864)
- Eulima columnaria May, 1916
- Eulima communis Verkrüzen fide Paetel, 1887 - (nomen nudum)
- Eulima compacta Carpenter, 1864
- Eulima compsa Verrill & Bush, 1900
- Eulima confusa Bouchet & Warén, 1986
- Eulima crassiuscula Dunker fide Paetel, 1887 (temporary name)
- Eulima crossei (Brusina, 1886) (species inquirenda)
- Eulima cylindrata Watson, 1883 (taxon inquirendum)
- Eulima cylindrica Thiele, 1925
- † Eulima danae Tenison Woods, 1879
- Eulima definita Thiele, 1925
- Eulima dentaliopsis A. Adams, 1861 (taxon inquirendum)
- Eulima dentiens Dunker, 1871
- Eulima devistoma Bouchet & Warén, 1986
- Eulima diaphana Hedley, 1899
- Eulima distincta E. A. Smith, 1904
- Eulima dubia Anton, 1838 (taxon inquirendum)
- Eulima dysnoeta Dautzenberg & Foscher, 1896
- Eulima eburnea A. Adams, 1861
- Eulima elata Thiele, 1925
- Eulima elodia de Folin, 1867 (taxon inquirendum)
- Eulima encopicola Warén & Templado, 1994
- Eulima ephamilla Watson, 1883
- Eulima eurychada Watson, 1883
- Eulima excellens Verkrüzen fide Paetel, 1887
- Eulima fischeri Dautzenberg, 1912 (species inquirenda)
- Eulima flexuosa A. Adams, 1851
- Eulima fricata Hedley, 1907
- Eulima fulvocincta C. B. Adams, 1850
- Eulima fuscescens E. A. Smith, 1890
- Eulima fuscostrigata Carpenter, 1864
- Eulima fuscozonata Bouchet & Warén, 1986
- Eulima gentilomiana Issel, 1869 (species inquirenda)
- Eulima germana E. A. Smith, 1890
- Eulima gibba de Folin, 1867
- Eulima glabra (da Costa, 1778)
- Eulima gomphus Watson, 1883
- Eulima gracilenta (A. Adams, 1864)
- Eulima grimaldii Bouchet & Warén, 1986
- † Eulima hampdenensis Laws, 1935
- Eulima hastata (A. Adams, 1864)
- Eulima healeyi (Strong & Hertlein, 1939)
- Eulima hians Watson, 1883
- Eulima hyalina Watson, 1883
- Eulima inca (Bartsch, 1926)
- Eulima incerta Anton, 1838
- Eulima incolor Warén, A. & Ph. Bouchet, 1986
- † Eulima incondita Marwick, 1931
- Eulima inconspicua Watson, 1891 (species inquirenda)
- Eulima indeflexa A. Adams, 1861
- Eulima iota C. B. Adams, 1852
- Eulima jaculum (Pilsbry & Lowe, 1932)
- Eulima koeneni Brusina, 1893
- Eulima labiosa Sowerby I, 1834
- Eulima lacca Kuroda & Habe, 1971
- Eulima lactea A. Adams, 1854
- Eulima langleyi Sowerby III, 1892
- Eulima lapazana (Bartsch, 1917)
- Eulima latipes Watson, 1883
- Eulima leachi (A. Adams, 1861)
- Eulima legrandi Beddome, 1883
- Eulima leptostoma E. A. Smith, 1910
- Eulima leptozona Dautzenberg & Fischer H., 1896
- Eulima lodderae (Tate MS, Lodder, 1900)
- Eulima major (Sowerby I, 1834)
- Eulima malayana Thiele, 1925
- Eulima manzoniana Issel, 1869
- Eulima minuscula Turton, 1932
- Eulima mioacutissima (Sacco, 1892)
- Eulima modicella A. Adams, 1851
- Eulima montagueana Iredale, 1914
- Eulima mulata Rios & Absalao, 1990
- Eulima newtoni Brusina, 1893
- Eulima nitidula Deshayes, 1850 (taxon inquirendum)
- † Eulima obliqua (Hutton, 1885)
- Eulima oblonga Boettger, 1893
- Eulima obtusa de Folin, 1870 (taxon inquirendum)
- Eulima pachychila Boettger, 1893
- Eulima padangensis (Thiele, 1925)
- Eulima panamensis (Bartsch, 1917)
- Eulima parva Sowerby, 1866
- Eulima patula Dall & Simpson, 1901
- Eulima peracuta Thiele, 1925
- Eulima perspicua (W. R. B. Oliver, 1915)
- Eulima petterdi Beddome, 1883
- Eulima philippiana Dunker, 1860
- Eulima philippii Weinkauff, 1868
- Eulima picturata (A. Adams, 1864)
- Eulima politissima Newton, 1895
- Eulima psila Watson, 1883
- Eulima pusilla (A. Adams, 1864)
- Eulima pyramidalis A. Adams, 1851
- Eulima raymondi Rivers, 1904
- Eulima reclinata A. Adams, 1861
- Eulima recta C. B. Adams, 1852
- Eulima recurva Boettger, 1893
- Eulima riss Cantraine, 1835
- Eulima salsa (Bartsch, 1926)
- Eulima sarsi Bush, 1909
- Eulima scitula A. Adams, 1861
- Eulima semitorta A. Adams, 1861
- Eulima similis Thiele, 1925
- Eulima simplex Sowerby III, 1897
- Eulima strongylostoma Bouchet & Warén, 1986
- Eulima stylata A. Adams, 1861
- Eulima subconica E. A. Smith, 1890
- Eulima sumatrensis Thiele, 1925
- Eulima taeniata (A. Adams, 1864)
- Eulima tantilla (A. Adams, 1861)
- † Eulima taurinensis (Sacco, 1892)
- Eulima tenisoni Tryon, 1886
- Eulima tornata (Thiele, 1925)
- Eulima townsendi (Bartsch, 1917)
- Eulima translucida E. A. Smith, 1901
- † Eulima treadwelli Hutton, 1893
- Eulima triggi Cotton & Godfrey, 1932
- Eulima tristis Thiele, 1925
- Eulima tsushimensis Takano, Kimura & Kano, 2020
- Eulima tulearensis Lamy, 1910 (taxon inquirendum)
- Eulima turgidula (A. Adams, 1861)
- Eulima undulosa de Folin, 1893 (nomen dubium)
- Eulima unilineata (Adams & Reeve, 1850)
- Eulima valida A. Adams, 1861
- Eulima varians Sowerby I, 1834
- Eulima venusta Pease, 1868
- Eulima victoriae Gatliff & Gabriel, 1914
