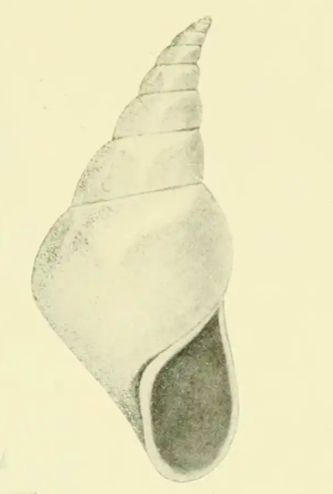
- Shell of Eulima gibba (original image)

Scientific classification
- Kingdom: Animalia
- Phylum: Mollusca
- Class: Gastropoda
- Subclass: Caenogastropoda
- Order: Littorinimorpha
- Family: Eulimidae
- Genus: Eulima
- Species: E. gibba

Binomial name
- Eulima gibba de Folin, 1867

Synonyms
- Melanella (Balcis) gibba de Folin, 1867

= Eulima gibba =

Species of gastropod

Eulima gibba is a species of sea snail, a marine gastropod mollusk in the family Eulimidae. The species is one of a number within the genus Eulima.

== Description ==
(Described as Melanella (Balcis) gibba) The shell is imperforate, ventricose, and acuminate posteriorly. The apex is rather obtuse, crystalline, and very highly polished. There are nine whorls, which increase slowly in size and are united by a simple suture. The body whorl is tumid and more strongly inflated toward the left. The aperture is semi-lunate. The margins are simple, and the columella is strongly reflected.

This species may be considered remarkable. It is corpulent and rather acuminate, recurved posteriorly, with its apex seeming to try to unite with the aperture. It is quite as diaphanous as Melanella adamantina and as highly polished. The spire is composed of nine whorls. The early whorls increase slowly in diameter, but proportionately they enlarge rather rapidly; the increase takes place especially upon the left side. The final whorl, which alone constitutes one-half of the entire shell, is very much developed on this side. It is inflated and extends considerably beyond the line which, judging from the margins of the preceding whorls, would serve as its contour. In order to recognize the aperture when the body whorl has reached its maximum extension, it is necessary that it be oriented toward the right following a very oblique line. These abnormal conditions, both in the body whorl and consequently in the entire shell, produce a hunchbacked outline, which serves as one of the principal diagnostics of this species. The suture is the same as that of M. adamantina. The aperture is cordate and elongate; its margins are well joined and are united by a curve which represents its greatest diameter. The margins are somewhat thickened; the left margin, especially at the base of the aperture, is reflected and is expanded over the body whorl in a decurrent angle, and at the same time it is reflected backwards over the columella.

== Distribution ==
This species was found off Margarita Island, Panama; it also occurs off the Pacific Coast of California and Mexico.
