= Melanella subemarginata =

Scientific classification
- Kingdom: Animalia
- Phylum: Mollusca
- Class: Gastropoda
- Subclass: Caenogastropoda
- Order: Littorinimorpha
- Family: Eulimidae
- Genus: Melanella
- Species: †M. subemarginata

Binomial name
- †Melanella subemarginata (Deshayes, 1862)

Synonyms
- † Eulima subemarginata Deshayes, 1862 superseded combination

Species of gastropod

Melanella subemarginata is an extinct species of sea snail, a marine gastropod mollusk in the family Eulimidae. The species is one of a number within the genus Melanella.

== Description ==
(Original description in Latin) The shell is rather short, with a sharp apex, and is very glossy. It is slightly twisted or curved along its length. It consists of eleven narrow, flat, closely joined whorls, which are connected by an obsolete and scarcely visible suture. The body whorl is short and convex, with a blunt base, and measures one-fifth of the total shell length. The aperture is short, oval and tapering to a point, angular at the posterior end, and widened and slightly expanded towards the anterior end. The columella is short and rather thick, while the outer lip is blunt and expanded, with a slight notch near the base.

(Further description originally in French) The shell closely resembles Eulima turgidula (A. Adams, 1861) in its general shape. Although it is elongated and very pointed at the apex, it is nevertheless relatively short compared with other species, as it is fairly broad at the base. The spire consists of eleven whorls, of which the first two or three are slightly convex, while all the remaining whorls are flat, closely joined, and separated by a barely visible suture. These whorls are narrow and very regular. The body whorl is very short and almost globular, scarcely projecting at the base, and measures approximately one-fifth of the total shell length.

The aperture is very small and short, terminating posteriorly in a deep angle, while anteriorly it is widened and somewhat flared. The columella is short, slightly concave, prominent, and cylindrical, and is thicker than that of most other species. The outer lip is particularly distinctive in shape: it is blunt and fairly thick, with a profile forming a small circular arc, and is deeply indented at its point of attachment to the penultimate whorl.

This rather rare shell measures 5–6 millimetres in length and nearly 2 millimetres in diameter.

== Distribution ==
Fossils of this species were found in the Paris Basin, France.
