= Melanella polygyra =

Scientific classification
- Kingdom: Animalia
- Phylum: Mollusca
- Class: Gastropoda
- Subclass: Caenogastropoda
- Order: Littorinimorpha
- Family: Eulimidae
- Genus: Melanella
- Species: †M. polygyra

Binomial name
- †Melanella polygyra (Charlesworth, 1851)

Synonyms
- † Eulima polygyra Charlesworth, 1851 superseded combination

Species of gastropod

Melanella polygyra is an extinct species of sea snail, a marine gastropod mollusk in the family Eulimidae. The species is one of a number within the genus Melanella.

† Melanella polygyra (A. Adams, 1854) is a junior homonym and is a synonym of † Eulima politissima R. B. Newton, 1895

== Distribution ==
Fossils from this species were found in Hampshire, Great Britain.
