= Melanella muelleriae =

- Shell of Melanella muelleriae

Scientific classification
- Kingdom: Animalia
- Phylum: Mollusca
- Class: Gastropoda
- Subclass: Caenogastropoda
- Order: Littorinimorpha
- Superfamily: Vanikoroidea
- Family: Eulimidae
- Genus: Melanella
- Species: M. muelleriae

Binomial name
- Melanella muelleriae (Sturany, 1903)

Synonyms
- Eulima muelleriae Sturany, 1903 (original combination)

Species of gastropod

Melanella muelleriae is a species of sea snail, a marine gastropod mollusk in the family Eulimidae.

== Description ==
(Original description in German) The new species is based on a single specimen found in Mülleria mauritiana (Quoy & Gaimard, 1834), synonym of Actinopyga mauritiana (Quoy & Gaimard, 1834) (Dr. V. Marenzeller discovered the shell while identifying that holothurian). It is closely related to Eulima modicella A. Adams, 1854 from Japan and the Philippines, but differs from it in several respects. The shell is strongly inclined toward the right (thus, it is concave on the left and convex on the upper right) and consists of about 11 whorls that gradually increase in size. The height of the shell is 3.4 mm, its width is 1.2 mm, and the height of the aperture is approximately 1 mm.

== Distribution ==
This species occurs in the Red Sea.
