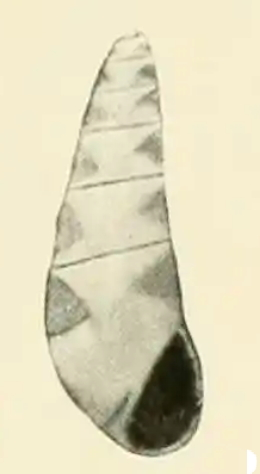
- Shell of Melanella iotoides (original image)

Scientific classification
- Kingdom: Animalia
- Phylum: Mollusca
- Class: Gastropoda
- Subclass: Caenogastropoda
- Order: Littorinimorpha
- Family: Eulimidae
- Genus: Melanella
- Species: M. iotoides

Binomial name
- Melanella iotoides Bartsch, 1916

Synonyms
- Melanella iota Bartsch, 1915 (eplaced by Melanella iotoides Bartsch, 1916 on account of secondary homonymy with Eulima iota C. B. Adams 1852)

= Melanella iotoides =

Species of gastropod

Melanella iotoides is a species of sea snail, a marine gastropod mollusk in the family Eulimidae. The species is one of many species known to exist within the genus Melanella.

== Description ==
The length of the shell attains 1.5 mm, its diameter 0.5 mm.

(Original description) The shell is exceedingly minute, translucent, and bluish-white, and it is falcate. The whorls are almost flattened and appressed at the summit, separated by a scarcely perceptible suture, and they are of glassy texture and marked by an occasional inconspicuous varix. The periphery of the body whorl is well rounded. The base is somewhat attenuated and well rounded. The aperture is oval; the outer lip is thin and clavate, while the inner lip is short, strongly curved, and appressed. The parietal wall is covered by a thick callus.

== Distribution ==
This species occurs in the Pacific Ocean off Ecuador; also off South Africa (Port Alfred)
