= Eulima pyramidalis =

Scientific classification
- Kingdom: Animalia
- Phylum: Mollusca
- Class: Gastropoda
- Subclass: Caenogastropoda
- Order: Littorinimorpha
- Family: Eulimidae
- Genus: Eulima
- Species: E. pyramidalis

Binomial name
- Eulima pyramidalis A. Adams, 1851

Species of gastropod

Eulima pyramidalis is a species of a sea snail, a marine gastropod mollusk in the family Eulimidae. This species is one of a number within the genus Eulima.
