= Eulima lactea =

Scientific classification
- Kingdom: Animalia
- Phylum: Mollusca
- Class: Gastropoda
- Subclass: Caenogastropoda
- Order: Littorinimorpha
- Family: Eulimidae
- Genus: Eulima
- Species: E. lactea

Binomial name
- Eulima lactea A. Adams, 1854

Synonyms
- Eulima exlactea Sacco, 1892

Species of gastropod

Eulima lactea is a species of sea snail, a marine gastropod mollusk in the family Eulimidae. The species is one of a number within the genus Eulima. It is found in the Red Sea.
