= Eulima lodderae =

Scientific classification
- Kingdom: Animalia
- Phylum: Mollusca
- Class: Gastropoda
- Subclass: Caenogastropoda
- Order: Littorinimorpha
- Family: Eulimidae
- Genus: Eulima
- Species: E. lodderae

Binomial name
- Eulima lodderae Tate MS, Lodder, 1900

Synonyms
- Eulima vitrea Petterd, 1884; Hemiliostraca vitrea Petterd, 1884; Leiostraca lodderae Tate MS, Lodder, 1900

Species of gastropod

Eulima lodderae is a species of sea snail, a marine gastropod mollusk in the family Eulimidae. The species is one of a number within the genus Eulima.
