= Eulima adamsii =

Scientific classification
- Kingdom: Animalia
- Phylum: Mollusca
- Class: Gastropoda
- Subclass: Caenogastropoda
- Order: Littorinimorpha
- Family: Eulimidae
- Genus: Eulima
- Species: E. adamsii

Binomial name
- Eulima adamsii G.B. Sowerby II, 1866

Synonyms
- Eulima nitida A. Adams, 1861

Species of gastropod

Eulima adamsii is a species of sea snail, a marine gastropod mollusk in the family Eulimidae. The species is one of a number within the genus Eulima.
