= Eulima ephamilla =

Scientific classification
- Kingdom: Animalia
- Phylum: Mollusca
- Class: Gastropoda
- Subclass: Caenogastropoda
- Order: Littorinimorpha
- Family: Eulimidae
- Genus: Eulima
- Species: E. ephamilla

Binomial name
- Eulima ephamilla Watson, 1883

Synonyms
- Eulima (Liostraca) rectiuscula Dall, 1890; Melanella rectiuscula Dall, 1927

Species of gastropod

Eulima ephamilla is a species of sea snail, a marine gastropod mollusk in the family Eulimidae. The species is one of a number within the genus Eulima.

== Description ==
The maximum recorded shell length is 8.4 mm.

(Described as Melanella rectiuscula) The small shell is slender, polished, and white. It has a swollen, blunt protoconch consisting of two whorls, followed by ten slightly convex whorls. The suture is distinct and shallow, and is not glazed over. The sculpture consists only of faint incremental lines. The base is elongately rounded and imperforate. The aperture is subovate, with a simple outer lip that is slightly convexly arcuate and a short, slightly raised inner lip.

== Distribution ==
This species occurs in the Atlantic Ocean off Florida, USA.

== Habitat ==
Minimum recorded depth is 640 m. Maximum recorded depth is 640 m.
