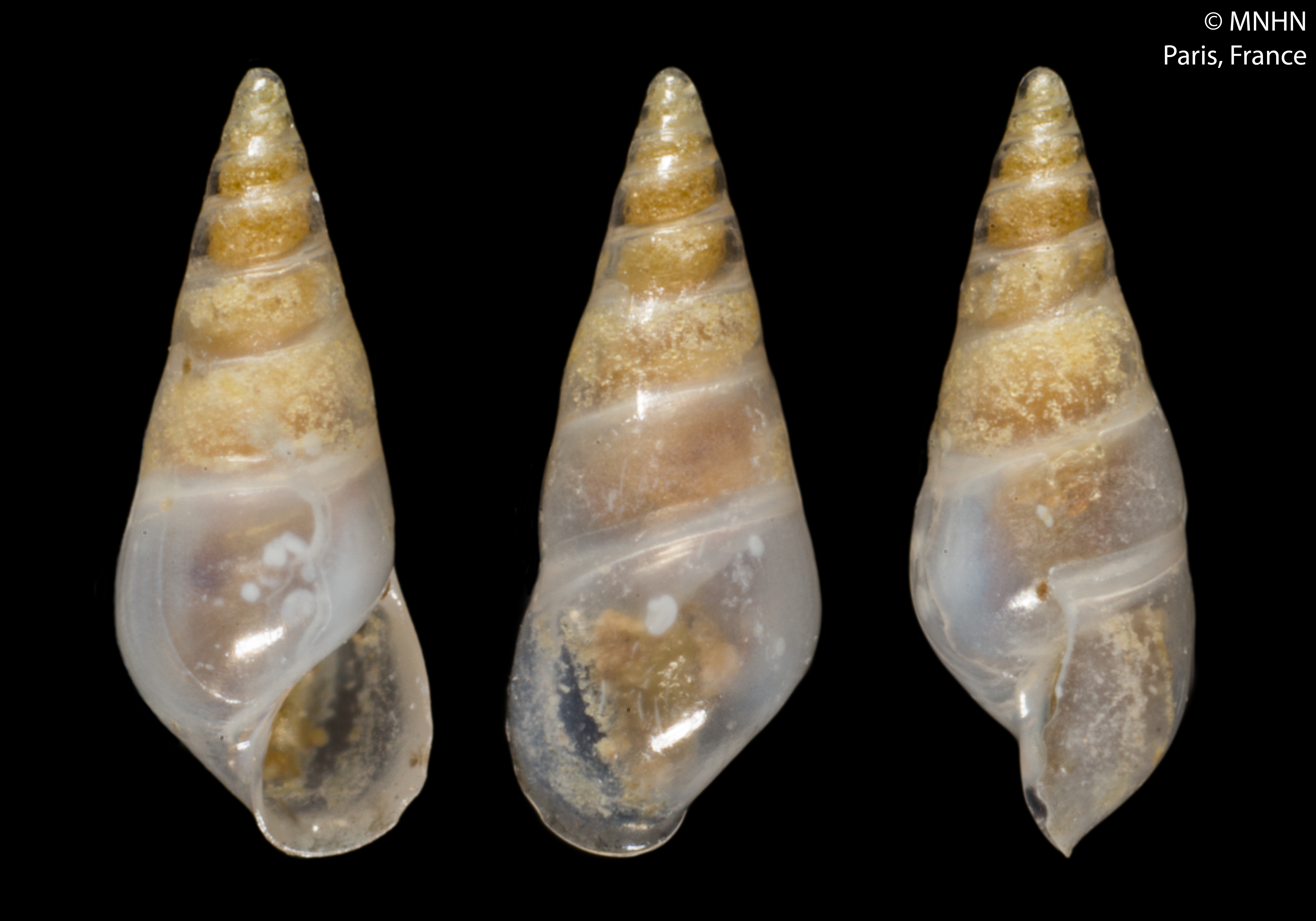
- Shell of Eulima chionea (holotype at MNHN, Paris)

Scientific classification
- Kingdom: Animalia
- Phylum: Mollusca
- Class: Gastropoda
- Subclass: Caenogastropoda
- Order: Littorinimorpha
- Family: Eulimidae
- Genus: Eulima
- Species: E. chionea

Binomial name
- Eulima chionea Bouchet & Warén, 1986

= Eulima chionea =

Species of gastropod

Eulima chionea is a species of sea snail, a marine gastropod mollusk in the family Eulimidae. The species is one of a number within the genus Eulima.

== Distribution ==
This marine species occurs in the following locations:

- European waters (Atlantic Ocean)

== Description ==
The maximum recorded shell length is 2.4 mm.

== Habitat ==
Minimum recorded depth is 4950 m. Maximum recorded depth is 4950 m.
