= Eulima germana =

Scientific classification
- Kingdom: Animalia
- Phylum: Mollusca
- Class: Gastropoda
- Subclass: Caenogastropoda
- Order: Littorinimorpha
- Family: Eulimidae
- Genus: Eulima
- Species: E. germana

Binomial name
- Eulima germana E. A. Smith, 1890

Species of gastropod

Eulima germana is a species of sea snail, a marine gastropod mollusk in the family Eulimidae. The species is one of a number within the genus Eulima. As the name suggests, this species is mainly distributed off the coasts of Germany and minor German Exclusive Economic Zones.
