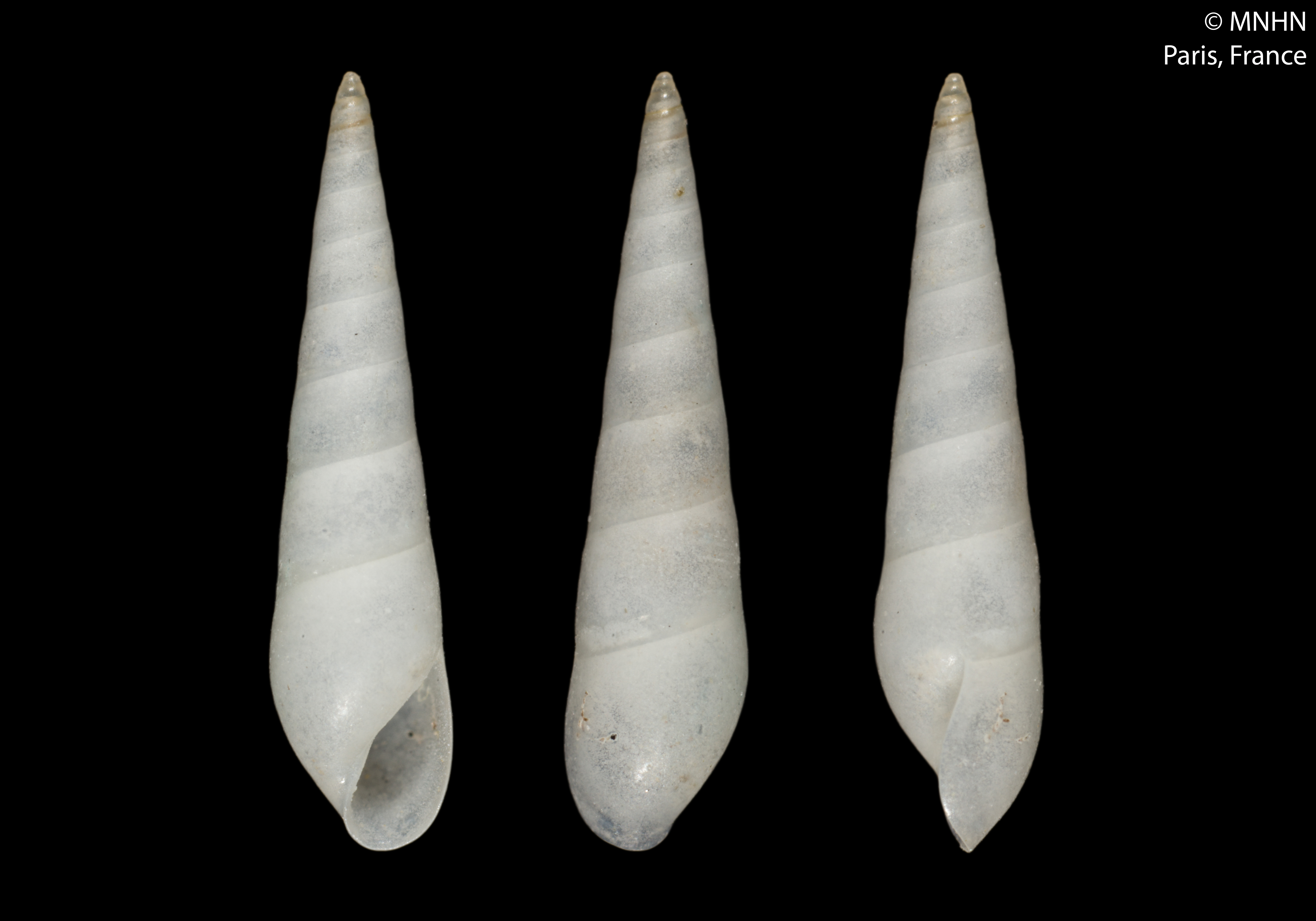
- Shell of Eulima grimaldii (holotype at MNHN, Paris)

Scientific classification
- Kingdom: Animalia
- Phylum: Mollusca
- Class: Gastropoda
- Subclass: Caenogastropoda
- Order: Littorinimorpha
- Family: Eulimidae
- Genus: Eulima
- Species: E. grimaldii

Binomial name
- Eulima grimaldii Bouchet & Warén, 1986

= Eulima grimaldii =

Species of gastropod

Eulima grimaldii is a species of sea snail, a marine gastropod mollusk in the family Eulimidae. The species is one of a number within the genus Eulima.

== Description ==
The length of the shell attains 6 mm.

== Distribution ==
This species was found in the Mediterranean Sea off Monaco.
