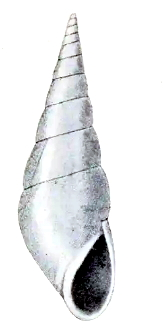
- Shell of Eulima elodia (original image)

Scientific classification
- Kingdom: Animalia
- Phylum: Mollusca
- Class: Gastropoda
- Subclass: Caenogastropoda
- Order: Littorinimorpha
- Family: Eulimidae
- Genus: Eulima
- Species: E. elodia

Binomial name
- Eulima elodia de Folin, 1867

Synonyms
- Melanella (Melanella) elodia (de Folin, 1867)

= Eulima elodia =

Species of gastropod

Eulima elodia is a species of sea snail, a marine gastropod mollusk in the family Eulimidae. The species is one of a number within the genus Eulima.

This is a taxon inquirendum.

== Description ==
The shell is imperforate, elongate, polished, and milky-white, with a subopaque surface. Its spire is conoidal, and the apex is rather obtuse. The shell consists of 11 to 12 whorls that increase slowly and are united by a simple suture. The body whorl measures approximately two-fifths as high as the entire shell. The aperture is cordate and subopaque, rounded at the base, with margins that are a little thickened, while the columella is feebly reflexed.

Like the other species in Eulima, this species is graceful and elegant in outline and in the beauty of its luster. It is much elongated, with the right side almost rectilinear and the left side slightly convex — yet this does not prevent the shell from appearing conoidal. The apex, although very slightly obtuse, may be said to be acute, since it in no way clashes with the acuminate outline. The spire is composed of 11 or 12 whorls that increase very slowly. The body whorl, which is imperforate, is equal to about two-fifths of the total altitude, and the whorls are united by a simple suture that may be called a very clearly but feebly impressed line.

The aperture is slightly oblique and cordate, its margins being smoothly united at the base by a curve that marks the greatest width. Though not sharp, the margins are scarcely thickened at all, the left margin enlarging a little so as to spread out over the side of the body whorl and over the columella, which is somewhat enlarged and appears to be reflected. On certain days Eulima elodia, being milky-white, seems almost opaque; nevertheless it is brilliantly polished and rather diaphanous, so that a certain direction of the light may make all the details of the interior structure apparent and give it the appearance of a double suture. It may be said that the true suture is a white ribbon, more strongly marked than that which lies posterior to it and exactly simulates it. By following this ribbon, and at the same time the suture, as far as the angle of the aperture on the final whorl, the illusion is naturally dissipated.

== Diistribution ==
This marine species was found off Margarita Island, Panama.
