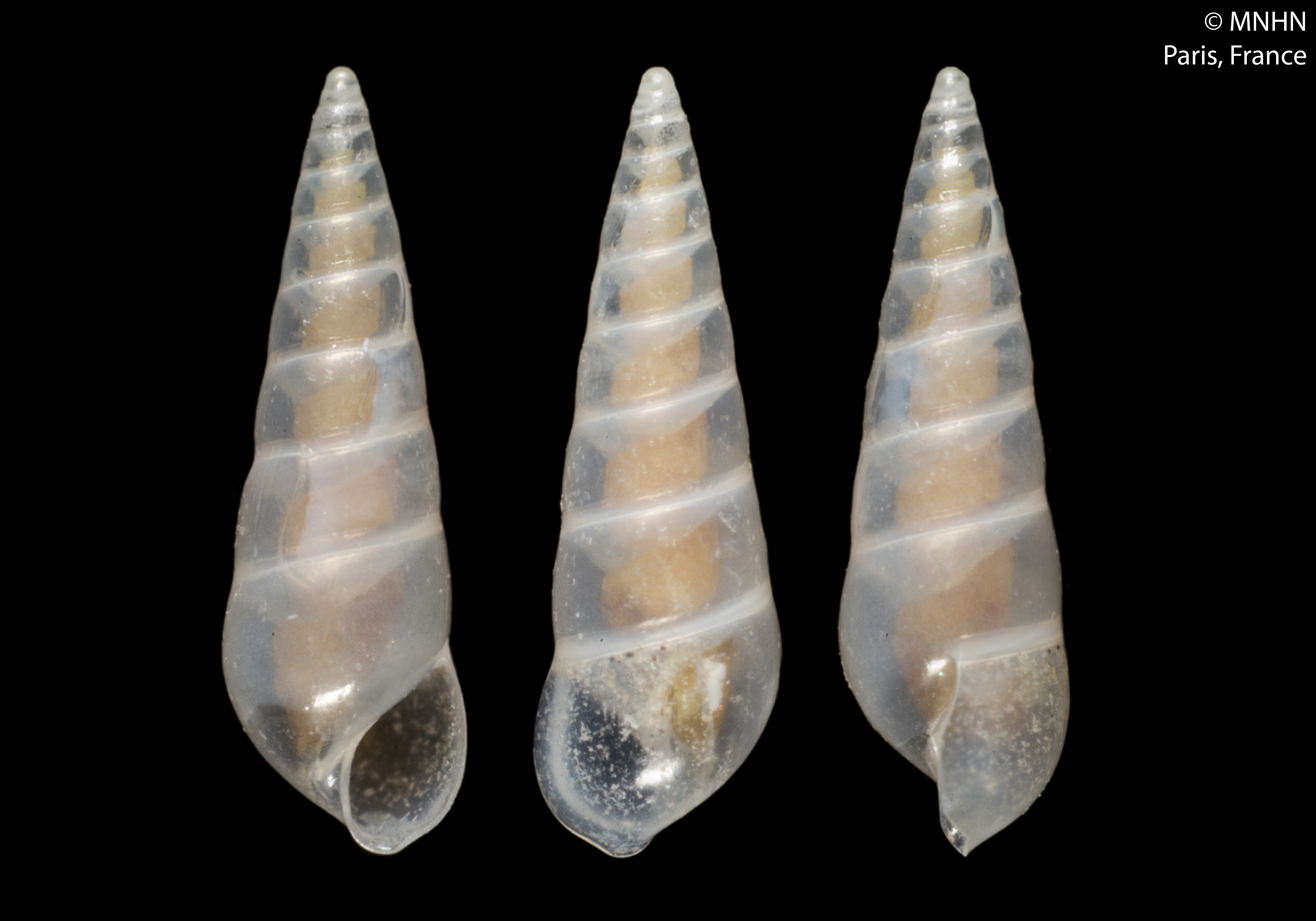
- Shell of Eulima anonyma (holotype at MNHN, Paris)

Scientific classification
- Kingdom: Animalia
- Phylum: Mollusca
- Class: Gastropoda
- Subclass: Caenogastropoda
- Order: Littorinimorpha
- Family: Eulimidae
- Genus: Eulima
- Species: E. anonyma

Binomial name
- Eulima anonyma Bouchet & Warén, 1986

= Eulima anonyma =

Species of gastropod

Eulima anonyma is a species of sea snail, a marine gastropod mollusk in the family Eulimidae. The species is one of a number within the genus Eulima.

== Description ==
The shell measures approximately 4 mm in length.

== Distribution ==
This species occurs in the following locations:

- Bay of Biscay
- European waters (ERMS scope)
