= Eulima atypha =

Scientific classification
- Kingdom: Animalia
- Phylum: Mollusca
- Class: Gastropoda
- Subclass: Caenogastropoda
- Order: Littorinimorpha
- Family: Eulimidae
- Genus: Eulima
- Species: E. atypha

Binomial name
- Eulima atypha Verrill & Bush, 1900

Synonyms
- Melanella atypha (Verrill & Bush, 1900)

Species of gastropod

Eulima atypha is a species of sea snail, a marine gastropod mollusk in the family Eulimidae. The species is one of a number within the genus Eulima.

== Distribution ==
This species occurs in the following locations:

- Gulf of Mexico
