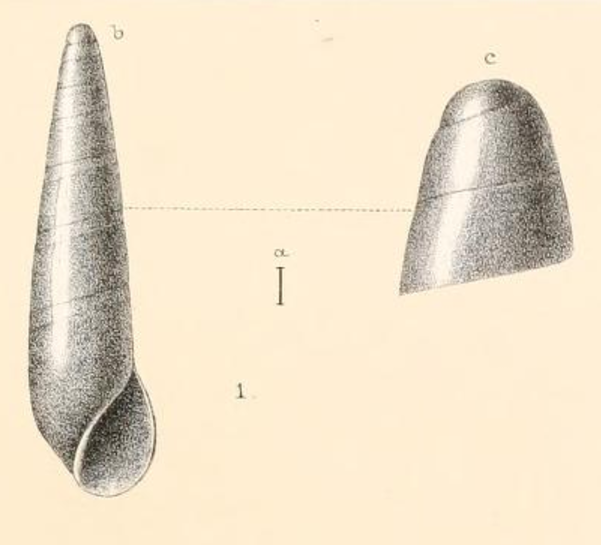
- Robert Boog Watson's illustration of the E. cylindrata shell and apex.

Scientific classification
- Kingdom: Animalia
- Phylum: Mollusca
- Class: Gastropoda
- Subclass: Caenogastropoda
- Order: Littorinimorpha
- Family: Eulimidae
- Genus: Eulima
- Species: E. cylindrata

Binomial name
- Eulima cylindrata Watson, 1883

= Eulima cylindrata =

Species of gastropod

Eulima cylindrata is a species of sea snail, it is a marine gastropod mollusk in the family Eulimidae. The species is one of a number within the genus Eulima.
