= Eulima broadbentae =

Scientific classification
- Kingdom: Animalia
- Phylum: Mollusca
- Class: Gastropoda
- Subclass: Caenogastropoda
- Order: Littorinimorpha
- Family: Eulimidae
- Genus: Eulima
- Species: E. broadbentae

Binomial name
- Eulima broadbentae Cotton & Godfrey, 1932

Synonyms
- Strombiformis broadbentae Cotton & Godfrey, 1932

Species of gastropod

Eulima broadbentae is a species of sea snail, a marine gastropod mollusk in the family Eulimidae. The species is one of a number within the genus Eulima.
