= Eulima perspicua =

Scientific classification
- Kingdom: Animalia
- Phylum: Mollusca
- Class: Gastropoda
- Subclass: Caenogastropoda
- Order: Littorinimorpha
- Family: Eulimidae
- Genus: Eulima
- Species: E. perspicua

Binomial name
- Eulima perspicua (Oliver, 1915)

Synonyms
- Hemiliostraca perspicua Oliver, 1915; Subularia perspicua Oliver, 1915

Species of gastropod

Eulima perspicua is a species of sea snail, a marine gastropod mollusk in the family Eulimidae.

== Distribution ==
This marine species is endemic to New Zealand.
