= Eulima victoriae =

Scientific classification
- Kingdom: Animalia
- Phylum: Mollusca
- Class: Gastropoda
- Subclass: Caenogastropoda
- Order: Littorinimorpha
- Family: Eulimidae
- Genus: Eulima
- Species: E. victoriae

Binomial name
- Eulima victoriae Gatliff & Gabriel, 1914

Synonyms
- Melanella victoriae (Gatliff & Gabriel, 1914)

Species of gastropod

Eulima victoriae is a species of sea snail, a marine gastropod mollusk in the family Eulimidae. The species is one of a number within the genus Eulima.

== Distribution ==
This marine species is endemic to Australia and occurs off Victoria.
