= Eulima philippiana =

Scientific classification
- Kingdom: Animalia
- Phylum: Mollusca
- Class: Gastropoda
- Subclass: Caenogastropoda
- Order: Littorinimorpha
- Family: Eulimidae
- Genus: Eulima
- Species: E. philippiana

Binomial name
- Eulima philippiana Dunker, 1860

Synonyms
- Eulima dunkeriana Pilsbry, 1901

Species of gastropod

Eulima philippiana is a species of sea snail, a marine gastropod mollusk in the family Eulimidae. The species is one of a number within the genus Eulima. Apparently, this species resembles a member of the genus Hypermastus, but the generic allocation remains uncertain.
