= Eulima leptozona =

Scientific classification
- Kingdom: Animalia
- Phylum: Mollusca
- Class: Gastropoda
- Subclass: Caenogastropoda
- Order: Littorinimorpha
- Family: Eulimidae
- Genus: Eulima
- Species: E. leptozona

Binomial name
- Eulima leptozona Dautzenberg & Fischer H., 1896

Species of gastropod

Eulima leptozona is a species of sea snail, a marine gastropod mollusk in the family Eulimidae. The species is one of a number within the genus Eulima.

== Description ==
The shell measures approximately 3 mm and can be found at depths of about 815 m below sea level.

== Distribution ==
This species occurs in the following locations:

- European waters (ERMS scope)
