= Eulima fricata =

Scientific classification
- Kingdom: Animalia
- Phylum: Mollusca
- Class: Gastropoda
- Subclass: Caenogastropoda
- Order: Littorinimorpha
- Family: Eulimidae
- Genus: Eulima
- Species: E. fricata

Binomial name
- Eulima fricata Hedley, 1907

Species of gastropod

Eulima fricata is a species of sea snail, a marine gastropod mollusk in the family Eulimidae. The species is one of a number of species within the genus Eulima.
