= Eulima raymondi =

Scientific classification
- Kingdom: Animalia
- Phylum: Mollusca
- Class: Gastropoda
- Subclass: Caenogastropoda
- Order: Littorinimorpha
- Family: Eulimidae
- Genus: Eulima
- Species: E. raymondi

Binomial name
- Eulima raymondi Rivers, 1904

Species of gastropod

Eulima raymondi is a species of sea snail, a marine gastropod mollusk in the family Eulimidae.
