= Eulima chyta =

Scientific classification
- Kingdom: Animalia
- Phylum: Mollusca
- Class: Gastropoda
- Subclass: Caenogastropoda
- Order: Littorinimorpha
- Family: Eulimidae
- Genus: Eulima
- Species: E. chyta

Binomial name
- Eulima chyta Watson, 1883

Species of gastropod

Eulima chyta is a species of sea snail, a marine gastropod mollusk in the family Eulimidae. The species is one of a number within the genus Eulima.

== Description ==
The maximum recorded shell length is 2.2 mm.

== Habitat ==
Minimum recorded depth is 768 m. Maximum recorded depth is 768 m.
