= Eulima latipes =

Scientific classification
- Kingdom: Animalia
- Phylum: Mollusca
- Class: Gastropoda
- Subclass: Caenogastropoda
- Order: Littorinimorpha
- Family: Eulimidae
- Genus: Eulima
- Species: E. latipes

Binomial name
- Eulima latipes Watson, 1883

Synonyms
- Melanella latipes (Watson, 1883)

Species of gastropod

Eulima latipes is a species of sea snail, a marine gastropod mollusk in the family Eulimidae. The species falls within the genus Eulima.

== Distribution ==
This marine species is endemic to Australia and occurs off the coast of Queensland.
