= Eulima subconica =

Scientific classification
- Kingdom: Animalia
- Phylum: Mollusca
- Class: Gastropoda
- Subclass: Caenogastropoda
- Order: Littorinimorpha
- Family: Eulimidae
- Genus: Eulima
- Species: E. subconica

Binomial name
- Eulima subconica E. A. Smith, 1890

Synonyms
- Eulima conica G. B. Sowerby II, 1866 (invalid: junior homonym of E. conica C.B. Adams, 1850; E. subconica is a replacement name)

Species of gastropod

Eulima subconica is a species of sea snail, a marine gastropod mollusk in the family Eulimidae. The species is one of a number within the genus Eulima.
