= Eulima excellens =

Scientific classification
- Kingdom: Animalia
- Phylum: Mollusca
- Class: Gastropoda
- Subclass: Caenogastropoda
- Order: Littorinimorpha
- Family: Eulimidae
- Genus: Eulima
- Species: E. excellens

Binomial name
- Eulima excellens Verkrüzen fide Paetel, 1887

Species of gastropod

Eulima excellens is a species of sea snail in the family Eulimidae. The species is one of a number within the genus Eulima.
