= Eulima bizona =

Scientific classification
- Kingdom: Animalia
- Phylum: Mollusca
- Class: Gastropoda
- Subclass: Caenogastropoda
- Order: Littorinimorpha
- Family: Eulimidae
- Genus: Eulima
- Species: E. bizona

Binomial name
- Eulima bizona A. Adams, 1864

Synonyms
- Leiostraca bizona A. Adams, 1864

Species of gastropod

Eulima bizona is a species of sea snail, a marine gastropod mollusk in the family Eulimidae. The species is one of a number within the genus Eulima.
