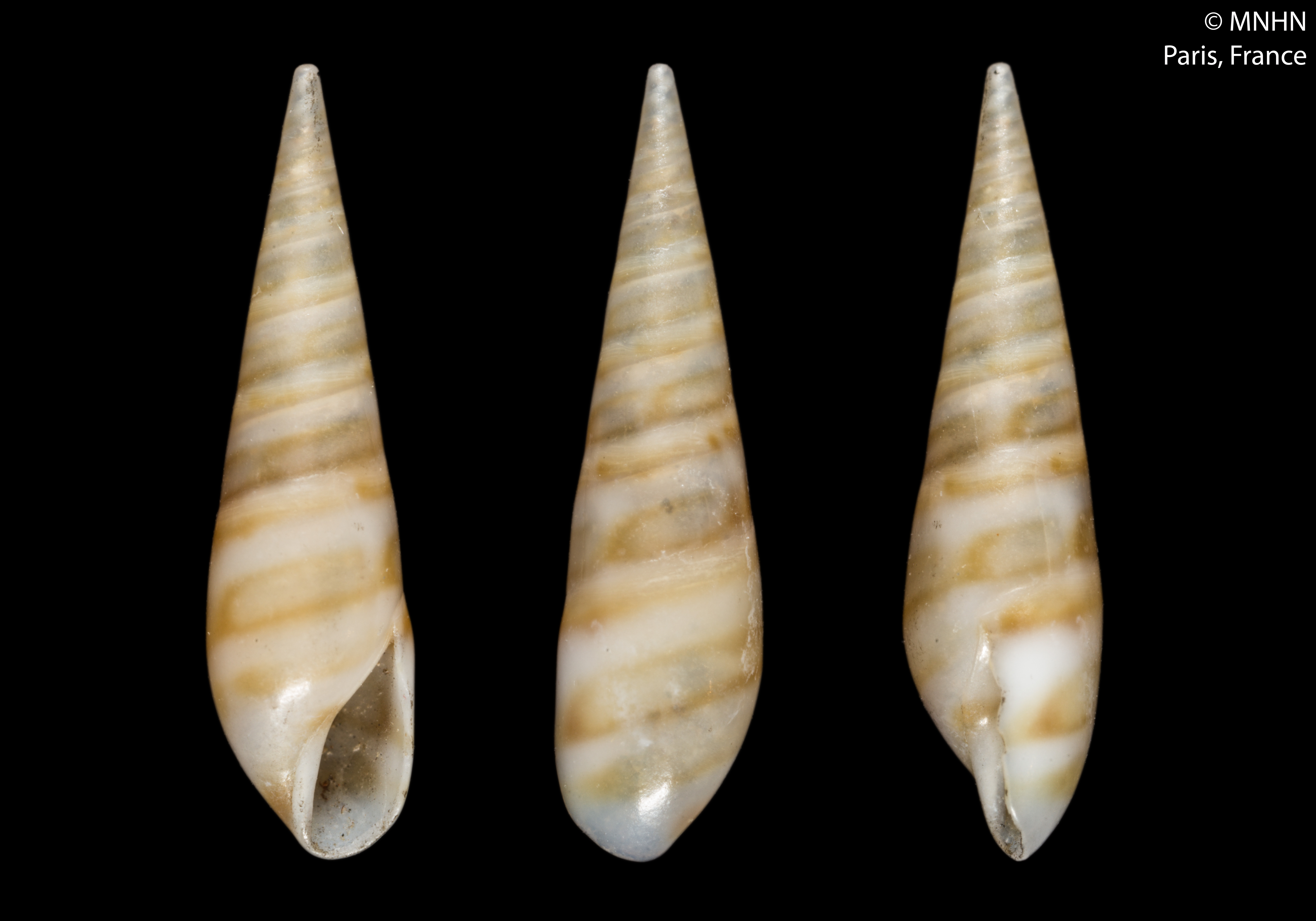
- shell of Eulima glabra (syntype at MNHN, Paris)

Scientific classification
- Kingdom: Animalia
- Phylum: Mollusca
- Class: Gastropoda
- Subclass: Caenogastropoda
- Order: Littorinimorpha
- Family: Eulimidae
- Genus: Eulima
- Species: E. glabra

Binomial name
- Eulima glabra da Costa, 1778

Synonyms
- Eulima cambessedesii Payraudeau, 1826; Eulima fasciata Renieri MS, Brocchi, 1814; Eulima flavocincta Mühlfeld, 1829; Eulima lineata G.B. Sowerby I, 1834; Eulima minor Monterosato, 1875; Eulima nana Jeffreys, 1884; Eulima pallidula Jeffreys, 1884; Eulima subulata Donovan, 1804; Eulima subulata var. minor Monterosato, 1875; Eulima subulata var. nana Jeffreys, 1884; Eulima subulata var. pallidula Jeffreys, 1884; Eulima subulatus Donovan, 1804; Helix flavocincta Mühlfeld, 1829; Leiostraca subulata Donovan, 1804; Melania cambessedesii Payraudeau, 1826; Melania donovani Forbes, 1838; Strombiformis glaber Da Costa, 1778; Strombiformis subulatus; Turbo fasciata Renieri MS, Brocchi, 1814; Turbo fasciatus Renieri, 1804; Turbo subulatus Donovan, 1804

= Eulima glabra =

Species of gastropod

Eulima glabra (Dutch: grote glanshoren) is a species of small parasitic sea snail, a marine gastropod mollusk in the family Eulimidae. The species is one of a number within the genus Eulima.

== Description ==
The length of the shell measures approximately 10 mm. The shell is tall, sharply pointed, slender, very glossy and nearly transparent; whorls flat-sided, sutures nearly invisible; no ornamentation. The aperture is a long and narrow, pointed apically; outer lip nearly straight in side view and forming a shallow, open canal basally. The shell has up to 12 Whorls, 3 or 4 belonging to the protoconch, but these, which are a little tumid, are often broken off. The last whorl is slender and, in apertural view, the outer lip continues the profile of the spire. Its edge is rounded, not sharp. There are a few irregular growth lines on the shell and occasional prosocline and nearly straight markings which show former positions of the outer lip. The last whorl occupies about half of the shell's height, the aperture a third.

=== Color ===
The vast majority of specimens appear as yellow-white, with orange-brown bands. Usually there are 3 spiral bands on each whorl of the spire, up to 6 on the last whorl of the shell. Some brown spiral lines, especially those at the periphery, may be represented by separate streaks which curve axially.

=== Soft parts ===
The head is a thin ledge carrying the opening of an introvert on its underside and a pair of tentacles anteriorly. These are long and tapering, each with an eye behind and medial to its base. A pallial tentacle arises from the mantle edge on the right. In males (small, young animals) a penis with an open seminal groove on its dorsal side arises behind the right tentacle; in females (larger, older) a vestige of this persists. The foot is large but narrow, broad anteriorly, with conspicuous opercular lobes behind. The animal is white.

=== Habitat ===
Eulima glabra is ectoparasitic on echinoderms, probably ophiuroids, and live sublittorally to depths of approximately 200 m. The animals are consecutive hermaphrodites and the life history probably includes a free veliger stage.

== Distribution ==
This marine species ranges from the Mediterranean to the British Isles where it has been found from south-west England, the south and west of Ireland, as far north as Shetland; not in the southern North Sea.

This species occurs in the following locations:

- British Isles
- European waters (ERMS scope)
- Greek Exclusive Economic Zone
- Irish Exclusive Economic Zone
- United Kingdom Exclusive Economic Zone
