= Eulima mulata =

Scientific classification
- Kingdom: Animalia
- Phylum: Mollusca
- Class: Gastropoda
- Subclass: Caenogastropoda
- Order: Littorinimorpha
- Family: Eulimidae
- Genus: Eulima
- Species: E. mulata

Binomial name
- Eulima mulata Rios & Absalão, 1990

Species of gastropod

Eulima mulata is a species of sea snail, a marine gastropod mollusk in the family Eulimidae. The species is one of a number within the genus Eulima.

== Distribution ==
- Brazil coast, between Pará and Rio Grande do Sul.

== Description ==
The maximum recorded shell length is 16 mm.

== Habitat ==
Minimum recorded depth is 1 m. Maximum recorded depth is 100 m.
