= Eulima newtoni =

Scientific classification
- Kingdom: Animalia
- Phylum: Mollusca
- Class: Gastropoda
- Subclass: Caenogastropoda
- Order: Littorinimorpha
- Family: Eulimidae
- Genus: Eulima
- Species: E. newtoni

Binomial name
- Eulima newtoni Brusina, 1893

Synonyms
- Eulima microstoma Edwards MS, Newton, 1891

Species of gastropod

Eulima newtoni is a species of sea snail, a marine gastropod mollusk in the family Eulimidae. The species is one in a number of within the genus Eulima.
