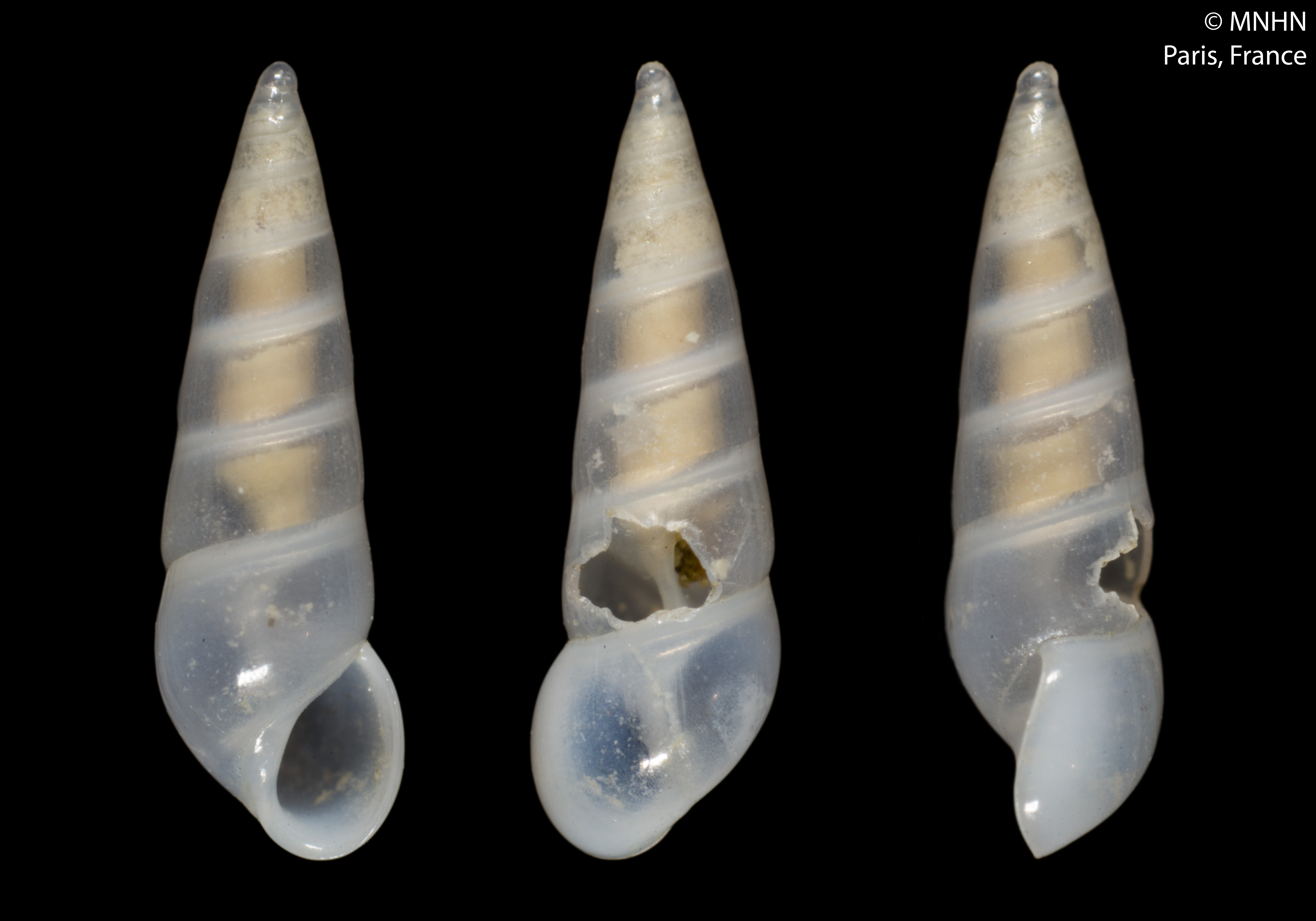
- Shell of Eulima strongylostoma (holotype at MNHN, Paris)

Scientific classification
- Kingdom: Animalia
- Phylum: Mollusca
- Class: Gastropoda
- Subclass: Caenogastropoda
- Order: Littorinimorpha
- Family: Eulimidae
- Genus: Eulima
- Species: E. strongylostoma

Binomial name
- Eulima strongylostoma Bouchet & Warén, 1986

= Eulima strongylostoma =

Species of gastropod

Eulima strongylostoma is a species of sea snail, a marine gastropod mollusk in the family Eulimidae. The species is one of a number within the genus Eulima.

== Description ==
The shell measures approximately 5 mm in length.

== Distribution ==
This species occurs in the following locations:

- European waters (ERMS scope): Porcupine abyssal plain of the Northern Atlantic Ocean.
