= Eulima fulvocincta =

Scientific classification
- Kingdom: Animalia
- Phylum: Mollusca
- Class: Gastropoda
- Subclass: Caenogastropoda
- Order: Littorinimorpha
- Family: Eulimidae
- Genus: Eulima
- Species: E. fulvocincta

Binomial name
- Eulima fulvocincta C. B. Adams, 1850

Synonyms
- Eulima masseneti de Folin, 1867

Species of gastropod

Eulima fulvocincta is a species of sea snail, a marine gastropod mollusk in the family Eulimidae. The species is one of a number within the genus Eulima.

== Distribution ==
This species occurs in the following locations:

- Caribbean Sea
- Gulf of Mexico
- Hispaniola
- Jamaica
- Lesser Antilles
- Panama
- Puerto Rico

== Description ==
The maximum recorded shell length is 6.6 mm (0.26 in).

== Habitat ==
Minimum recorded depth is 0 m. Maximum recorded depth is 115 m.
