= Eulima padangensis =

Scientific classification
- Kingdom: Animalia
- Phylum: Mollusca
- Class: Gastropoda
- Subclass: Caenogastropoda
- Order: Littorinimorpha
- Family: Eulimidae
- Genus: Eulima
- Species: E. ppadangensis

Binomial name
- Eulima ppadangensis Thiele, 1925

Synonyms
- Eulima (Leiostraca) padangensis Thiele, 1925

Species of gastropod

Eulima padangensis is a species of sea snail, a marine gastropod mollusk in the family Eulimidae. The species is one of a number within the genus Eulima.
