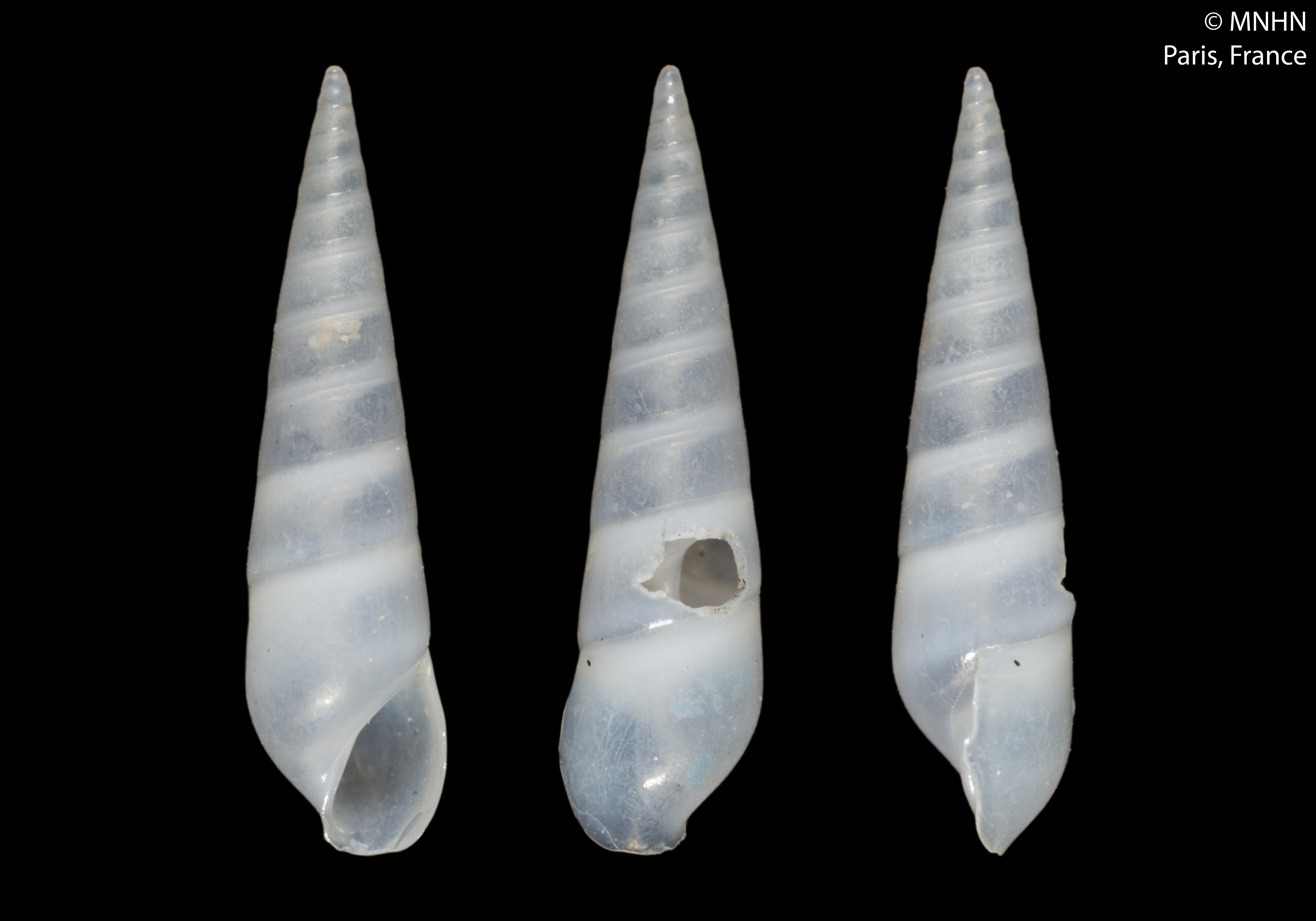
- Shell of Eulima incolor (holotype at MNHN, Paris)

Scientific classification
- Kingdom: Animalia
- Phylum: Mollusca
- Class: Gastropoda
- Subclass: Caenogastropoda
- Order: Littorinimorpha
- Family: Eulimidae
- Genus: Eulima
- Species: E. incolor

Binomial name
- Eulima incolor Bouchet & Warén, 1986

= Eulima incolor =

Species of gastropod

Eulima incolor is a species of sea snail, a marine gastropod mollusk in the family Eulimidae. The species is within the genus Eulima.

== Description ==
The length of the shell attains 6.5 mm.

== Distribution ==
This marine species occurs in the Bay of Biscay.
