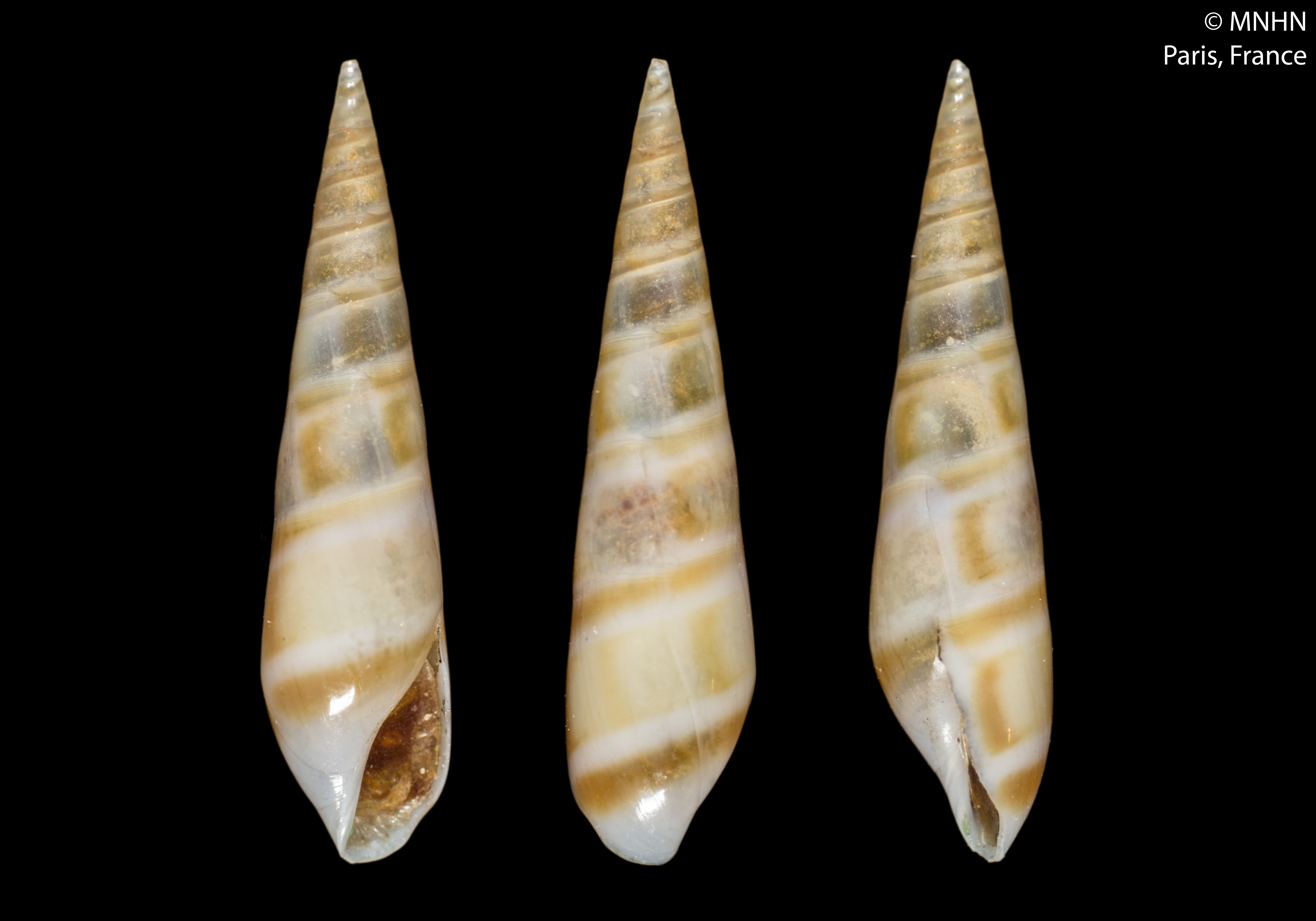
- Shell of Eulima angulosa (holotype at MNHN, Paris)

Scientific classification
- Kingdom: Animalia
- Phylum: Mollusca
- Class: Gastropoda
- Subclass: Caenogastropoda
- Order: Littorinimorpha
- Family: Eulimidae
- Genus: Eulima
- Species: E. angulosa

Binomial name
- Eulima angulosa Fischer-Piette & Nicklés, 1946

= Eulima angulosa =

Species of gastropod

Eulima angulosa is a species of sea snail, a marine gastropod mollusk in the family Eulimidae. The species is one of a number within the genus Eulima.

== Description ==
The length of the shell attains 11 mm.

== Distribution ==
This marine species occurs off Senegal and Gabon.
