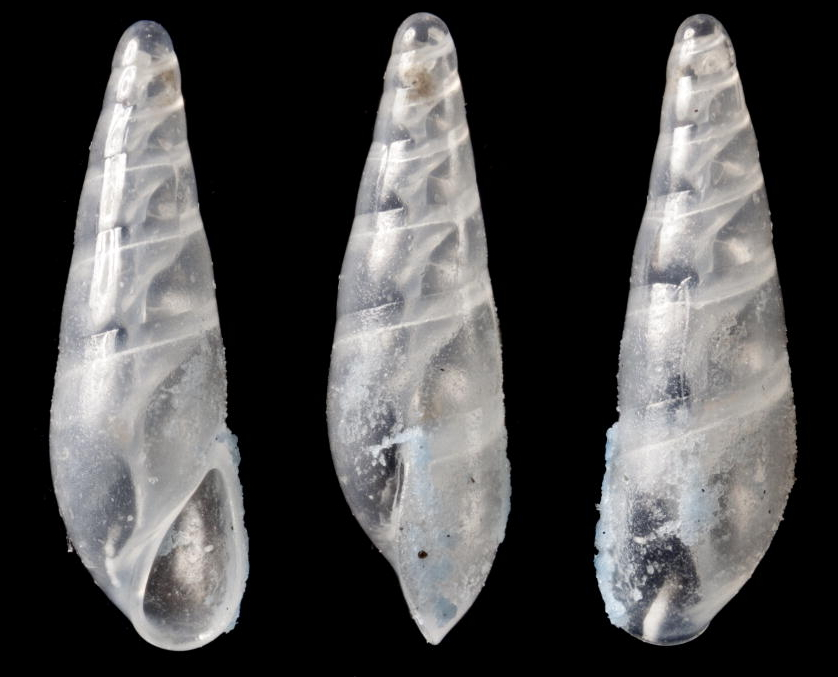
- Shell of Eulima translucida (holotype at Natural History Museum, London)

Scientific classification
- Kingdom: Animalia
- Phylum: Mollusca
- Class: Gastropoda
- Subclass: Caenogastropoda
- Order: Littorinimorpha
- Family: Eulimidae
- Genus: Eulima
- Species: E. translucida

Binomial name
- Eulima translucida E. A. Smith, 1901

= Eulima translucida =

Species of gastropod

Eulima translucida is a species of sea snail, a marine gastropod mollusk in the family Eulimidae. The species is one of a number within the genus Eulima.
