= Eulima philippii =

Scientific classification
- Kingdom: Animalia
- Phylum: Mollusca
- Class: Gastropoda
- Subclass: Caenogastropoda
- Order: Littorinimorpha
- Family: Eulimidae
- Genus: Eulima
- Species: E. philippii

Binomial name
- Eulima philippii Weinkauff, 1868

Synonyms
- Eulima curvata Chiereghini, 1867; Turbo curvatus Chiereghini MS, Brusina, 1870

Species of gastropod

Eulima philippii is a species of sea snail, a marine gastropod mollusk in the family Eulimidae. The species is one of a number within the genus Eulima.
