= Eulima confusa =

Scientific classification
- Kingdom: Animalia
- Phylum: Mollusca
- Class: Gastropoda
- Subclass: Caenogastropoda
- Order: Littorinimorpha
- Family: Eulimidae
- Genus: Eulima
- Species: E. confusa

Binomial name
- Eulima confusa Bouchet & Warén, 1986

Species of gastropod

Eulima confusa is a species of sea snail, a marine gastropod mollusk in the family Eulimidae. The species is one of a number within the genus Eulima.

== Distribution ==
This marine species occurs in the following locations:

- European waters (ERMS scope)
