= Eulima inca =

Scientific classification
- Kingdom: Animalia
- Phylum: Mollusca
- Class: Gastropoda
- Subclass: Caenogastropoda
- Order: Littorinimorpha
- Family: Eulimidae
- Genus: Eulima
- Species: E. inca

Binomial name
- Eulima inca Bartsch, 1926

Synonyms
- Strombiformis inca Bartsch, 1926

Species of gastropod

Eulima inca is a species of sea snail, a marine gastropod mollusk in the family Eulimidae. The species is one of a number within the genus Eulima.
