= Eulima tenisoni =

Scientific classification
- Kingdom: Animalia
- Phylum: Mollusca
- Class: Gastropoda
- Subclass: Caenogastropoda
- Order: Littorinimorpha
- Family: Eulimidae
- Genus: Eulima
- Species: E. tenisoni

Binomial name
- Eulima tenisoni Tryon, 1886

Synonyms
- Apicalia micans Tenison Woods, 1875; Eulima micans Tenison Woods, 1875; Melanella tenisoni (Tryon, 1886)

Species of gastropod

Eulima tenisoni is a species of sea snail, a marine gastropod mollusk in the family Eulimidae. The species is one of a number within the genus Eulima.

== Distribution ==
This marine species is endemic to Australia and occurs off South Australia, Tasmania, Victoria and Western Australia.
