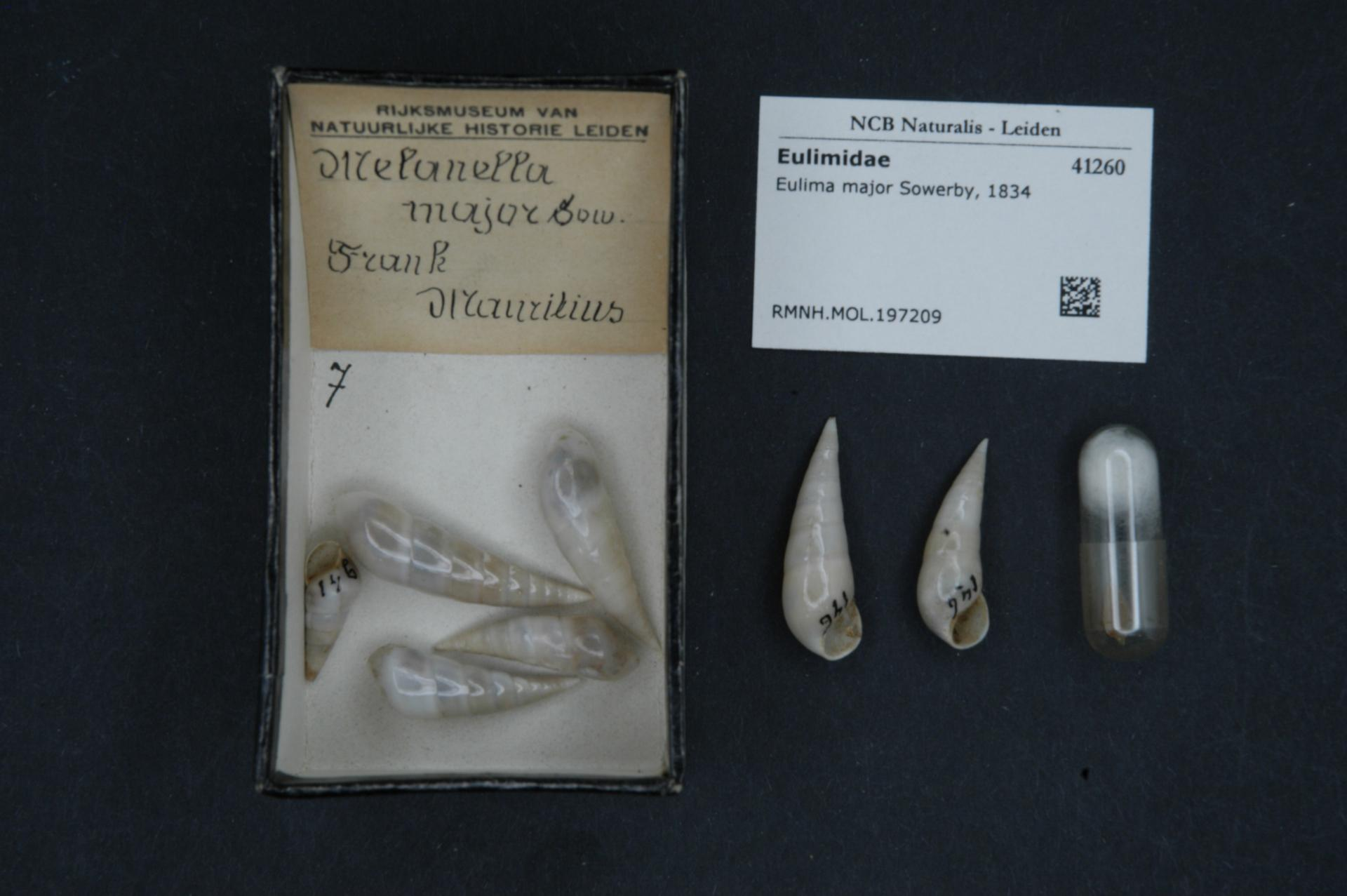

Scientific classification
- Kingdom: Animalia
- Phylum: Mollusca
- Class: Gastropoda
- Subclass: Caenogastropoda
- Order: Littorinimorpha
- Family: Eulimidae
- Genus: Eulima
- Species: E. major

Binomial name
- Eulima major G.B. Sowerby I, 1834

Synonyms
- Melanella thaanumii Pilsbry, 1917

= Eulima major =

Species of gastropod

Eulima major is a species of sea snail, a marine gastropod mollusk in the family Eulimidae. The species is one of a number within the genus Eulima.

== Description ==
The shell measures approximately 38 mm in length.

== Distribution ==
This species occurs in the following locations:

- Mauritius
