= Eulima acutissima =

Scientific classification
- Kingdom: Animalia
- Phylum: Mollusca
- Class: Gastropoda
- Subclass: Caenogastropoda
- Order: Littorinimorpha
- Family: Eulimidae
- Genus: Eulima
- Species: E. acutissima

Binomial name
- Eulima acutissima G.B. Sowerby II, 1866

Synonyms
- Eulima lesbia Angas, 1871; Leiostraca acutissima G.B. Sowerby II, 1866; Leiostraca lesbia Angas, 1871

Species of gastropod

Eulima acutissima is a species of sea snail, a marine gastropod mollusk in the family Eulimidae. The species is one of a number within the genus Eulima.

== Description ==
The shell measures approximately 13 mm in length.
