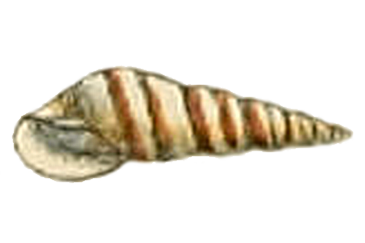

Scientific classification
- Kingdom: Animalia
- Phylum: Mollusca
- Class: Gastropoda
- Subclass: Caenogastropoda
- Order: Littorinimorpha
- Family: Eulimidae
- Genus: Eulima
- Species: E. bilineata

Binomial name
- Eulima bilineata Alder, 1848

Synonyms
- Eulima bilineata var. albida J. T. Marshall, 1902; Eulima bilineata var. exigua J. T. Marshall, 1893; Eulima trifasciata (J. Adams, 1800) sensu Winckworth, 1932 (misapplication); Eulima albida Marshall, 1902; Eulima exigua Marshall, 1902

= Eulima bilineata =

Species of gastropod

Eulima bilineata is a species of sea snail, a marine gastropod mollusk in the family Eulimidae. The species is one of a number within the genus Eulima.

== Description ==
The shell measures approximately 6 mm in length. Adult shells have a tall narrow conic outline, with up to 13 flat-sided whorls and a slightly cyrtoconoid profile. The sutures are very slight, paralleled internally and above by false sutures, the latter being often more conspicuous in live shells. The exterior of the shell is smooth, with very delicate growth lines that become visible through reflected light. The aperture is narrow, drop-shaped, and the outer lip arises tangentially to the last whorl between two brown spiral bands.

== Distribution ==
This species occurs in the following locations:

- Belgian Exclusive Economic Zone
- Caribbean Sea
- Cuba
- European waters (ERMS scope)
- Greek Exclusive Economic Zone
- Irish Exclusive Economic Zone
- Mediterranean Sea
- Northern coasts of Norway
- North East Atlantic
- Portuguese Exclusive Economic Zone
- Spanish Exclusive Economic Zone
- United Kingdom Exclusive Economic Zone
- Western coasts of Norway
- Wimereux

== Feeding type ==
- Parasitic
