= Eulima bifasciata =

Scientific classification
- Kingdom: Animalia
- Phylum: Mollusca
- Class: Gastropoda
- Subclass: Caenogastropoda
- Order: Littorinimorpha
- Family: Eulimidae
- Genus: Eulima
- Species: E. bifasciata

Binomial name
- Eulima bifasciata d'Orbigny, 1841

Synonyms
- Eulima oleacea Kurtz & Stimpson, 1851; Eulima onychina de Folin, 1867

Species of gastropod

Eulima bifasciata is a species of sea snail, a marine gastropod mollusk in the family Eulimidae. The species is one of a number within the genus Eulima.

== Distribution ==
This species occurs in the following locations:

- Caribbean Sea
- Colombia
- Costa Rica
- Cuba
- Gulf of Mexico
- Lesser Antilles
- Mexico
- Panama
- Puerto Rico
- Venezuela

== Description ==
The maximum recorded shell length is 10.6 mm.

== Habitat ==
Minimum recorded depth is 0 m. Maximum recorded depth is 84 m.

This species is known from seamounts and knolls.

Eulimid snails parasitize the external or internal parts of echinoderms such as sea cucumbers, sea urchins, sand dollars, sea stars, and other echinoderms, sucking small amounts of their body fluids for a living.

Their slick, glossy shells make it easy for them to live embedded in the bodies of those echinoderms.
