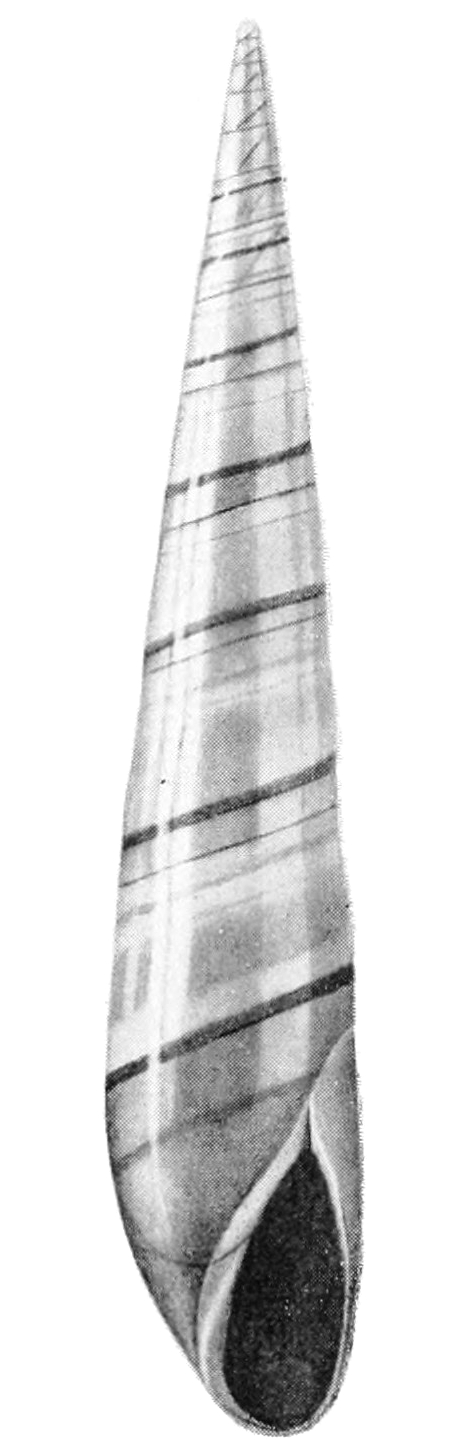
- Drawing of the apertural view of a shell of Eulima lapazana

Scientific classification
- Kingdom: Animalia
- Phylum: Mollusca
- Class: Gastropoda
- Subclass: Caenogastropoda
- Order: Littorinimorpha
- Family: Eulimidae
- Genus: Eulima
- Species: E. lapazana

Binomial name
- Eulima lapazana (Bartsch, 1917)

Synonyms
- Strombiformis lapazana Bartsch, 1917

= Eulima lapazana =

Species of gastropod

Eulima lapazana is a species of small, ectoparasitic sea snail, a marine gastropod mollusk in the family Eulimidae. The species is one of a number within the genus Eulima.
