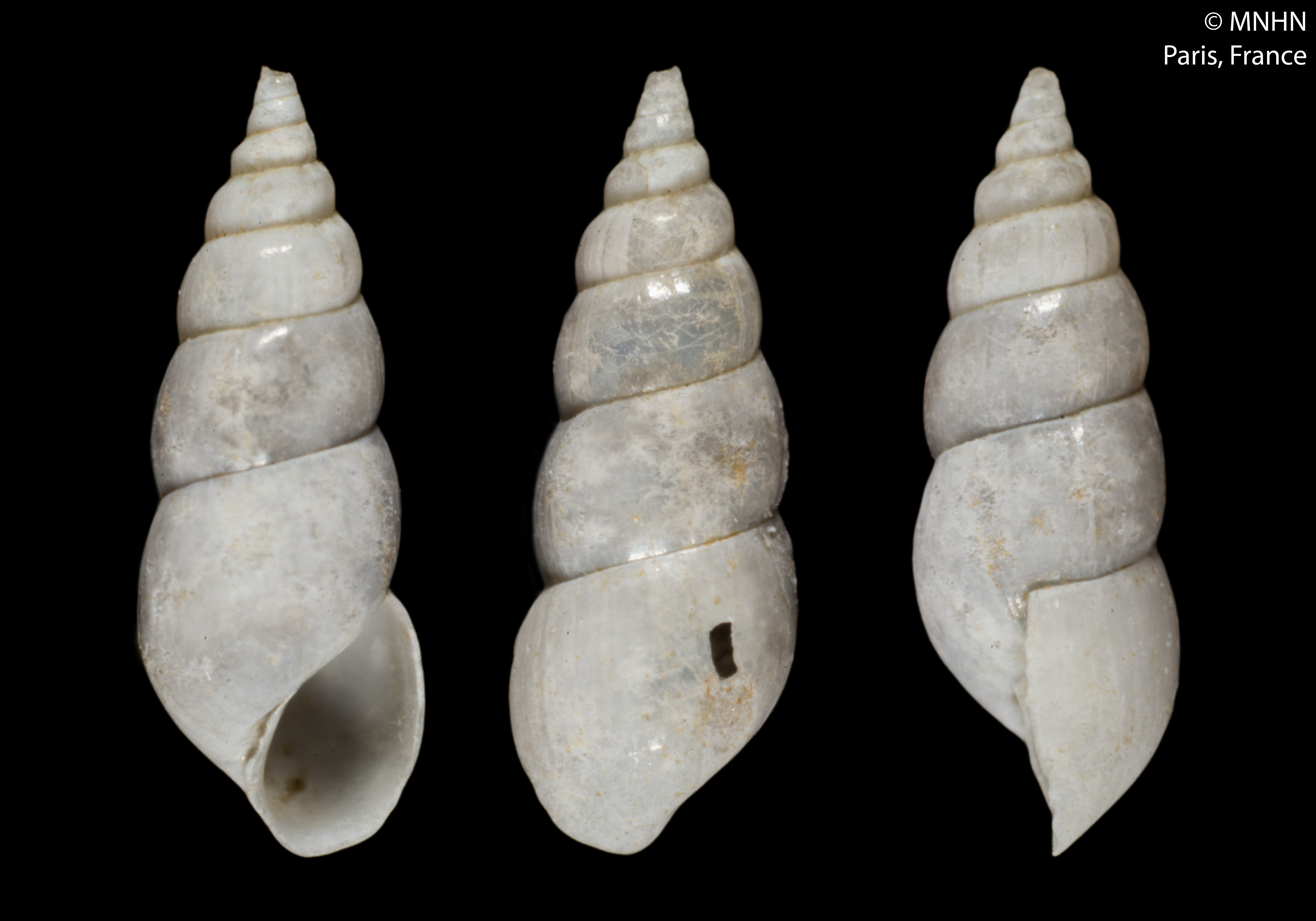
- Shell of Eulima fischeri (holotype at MNHN, Paris)

Scientific classification
- Kingdom: Animalia
- Phylum: Mollusca
- Class: Gastropoda
- Subclass: Caenogastropoda
- Order: Littorinimorpha
- Family: Eulimidae
- Genus: Eulima
- Species: E. fischeri

Binomial name
- Eulima fischeri Dautzenberg, 1912

Synonyms
- Eulima (Stiliferina) fischeri Dautzenberg, 1912· accepted, alternate representation (basionym)

= Eulima fischeri =

Species of gastropod

Eulima fischeri is a species of sea snail, a marine gastropod mollusk in the family Eulimidae. The species is within the genus Eulima. This is a taxon inquirendum meaning that its status as a species is doubtful.

== Description ==
The length of the shell attains 3.5 mm.

== Distribution ==
This species occurs in the Gulf of Guinea.
