= Melanella amblia =

Scientific classification
- Kingdom: Animalia
- Phylum: Mollusca
- Class: Gastropoda
- Subclass: Caenogastropoda
- Order: Littorinimorpha
- Family: Eulimidae
- Genus: Melanella
- Species: M. amblia

Binomial name
- Melanella amblia (Watson, 1883)

Synonyms
- Balcis amblia (R. B. Watson, 1883); Eulima amblia R. B. Watson, 1883 (original combination)

Species of gastropod

Melanella amblia is a species of sea snail, a marine gastropod mollusk in the family Eulimidae. The species is one of a number within the genus Melanella.

== Description ==
The length of the shell attains 3.18 mm; its diameter 1.19 mm.

(Original description) The shell is small, thin, and translucent to transparent. It is somewhat cylindrical and slightly bent, with a blunt tip. The whorls are nearly flat-sided, the suture is very slight and linear, and the aperture is oblong. The sculpture consists of very obscure microscopic lines of growth together with spiral scratches. The colour is glassy, weathering to translucent. The spire is narrow and slightly unsymmetrical, being a little bent to the right. There are six whorls; they are short, flattened, and scarcely convex on the side. The body whorl is somewhat long and has a very blunt, round base. The suture is indeed very slight. The aperture is oval and pointed above. The outer lip is curved a little flatly above but very roundly below; its edge retreats very much above and below and is prominent at the periphery. The inner lip forms a continuous, very slightly concave curve across the body and down the short columella, at the tip of which it is slightly angulated at its junction with the base.

== Distribution ==
This marine species occurs in the sub-Antarctic Indian Ocean haflway between Marion Island and Prince Edward Island.
