= Eulima modicella =

Scientific classification
- Kingdom: Animalia
- Phylum: Mollusca
- Class: Gastropoda
- Subclass: Caenogastropoda
- Order: Littorinimorpha
- Family: Eulimidae
- Genus: Eulima
- Species: E. modicella

Binomial name
- Eulima modicella A. Adams, 1854

Synonyms
- Melanella modicella (Adams, 1854)

Species of gastropod

Eulima modicella is a species of sea snail, a marine gastropod mollusk in the family Eulimidae. The species is one of a number within the genus Eulima.

== Distribution ==
This marine species is endemic to Australia and occurs off Queensland
