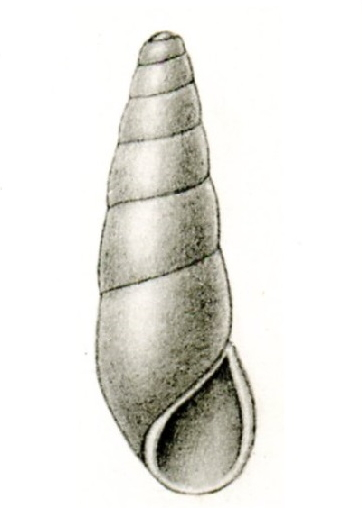
- Original drawing of a shell of Melanella cylindrica

Scientific classification
- Kingdom: Animalia
- Phylum: Mollusca
- Class: Gastropoda
- Subclass: Caenogastropoda
- Order: Littorinimorpha
- Family: Eulimidae
- Genus: Melanella
- Species: M. cylindrica

Binomial name
- Melanella cylindrica (Thiele, 1925)

Synonyms
- Eulima cylindrica Thiele, 1925

= Melanella cylindrica =

Species of gastropod

Melanella cylindrica is a species of sea snail, a marine gastropod mollusk in the family Eulimidae. The species is one of a number within the genus Melanella.

== Description ==
The shell measures 4.7 mm in height, while both its diameter and the height of the aperture are 1.5 mm.

(Original description in German) Some shells from the Agulhas Bank differ from the two similar species in being broader and thicker, and in having a much wider aperture that is somewhat expanded and distinctly produced below.

The apex is blunt and rounded. The shell is almost cylindrical, gradually widening towards the base. Its seven whorls are distinctly convex and increase regularly in size, with the body whorl somewhat inflated. The aperture is broad, slightly expanded, and sharply angled above; below, it is distinctly produced. The apertural margin is somewhat thickened and is joined by a distinct callus.

== Distribution ==
This marine species occurs off Cape Agulhas, South Africa.
