= Melanella breviuscula =

Scientific classification
- Kingdom: Animalia
- Phylum: Mollusca
- Class: Gastropoda
- Subclass: Caenogastropoda
- Order: Littorinimorpha
- Family: Eulimidae
- Genus: Melanella
- Species: M. breviuscula

Binomial name
- Melanella breviuscula (Dunker, 1875)

Synonyms
- Eulima breviuscula Dunker, 1875)

Species of gastropod

Melanella breviuscula is a species of sea snail, a marine gastropod mollusk in the family Eulimidae. The species is one of a number within the genus Melanella.

== Description ==
The length of the shell attains 5-6 mm.

(Original description in Latin) The shell is small, somewhat short and conical, rather solid, ivory-white, perfectly smooth, translucent, and highly glossy. It consists of nine to ten rather flat whorls, the last of which is nearly equal to one third of the total length of the shell. The aperture is oval and narrowed posteriorly, while the outer lip is slightly thickened.

== Distribution ==
This marine species occurs in warm temperate Northwest Atlantic: Northern Gulf of Mexico; tropical Northwestern Atlantic: Floridian, Bahamian, Eastern Caribbean, Western Caribbean;tTropical Southwestern Atlantic: Northeastern Brazil, Eastern Brazil; warm temperate Southwestern Atlantic: Southeastern Brazil, South Brazil.
