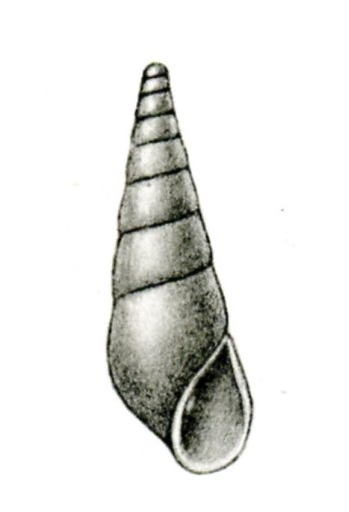
- Original drawing of a shell of Melanella agulhasensis

Scientific classification
- Kingdom: Animalia
- Phylum: Mollusca
- Class: Gastropoda
- Subclass: Caenogastropoda
- Order: Littorinimorpha
- Family: Eulimidae
- Genus: Melanella
- Species: M. agulhasensis

Binomial name
- Melanella agulhasensis (Thiele, 1925)

Synonyms
- Eulima agulhasensis Thiele, 1925

= Melanella agulhasensis =

Species of gastropod

Melanella agulhasensis is a species of sea snail, a marine gastropod mollusk in the family Eulimidae. The species is one of a number within the genus Melanella.

== Description ==
The shell measures 3.75 mm in height, while both its diameter and the height of the aperture are 1.25 mm.

(Original description in German) The shell consists of 8½ whorls. The first whorl is moderately large, rounded, slightly elevated, and clearly set off from the succeeding whorls. The remaining whorls are distinctly convex and increase regularly in size. The body whorl is rounded and imperforate. The margin of the aperture is joined by a distinct callus; on the right side, it projects forwards at the middle. The aperture is fairly large, sharply angled above, and elongated-pyriform.

== Distribution ==
This marine species occurs off Cape Agulhas, South Africa.
