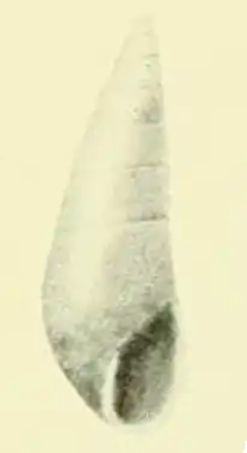
- Shell of Eulima iota (original image)

Scientific classification
- Kingdom: Animalia
- Phylum: Mollusca
- Class: Gastropoda
- Subclass: Caenogastropoda
- Order: Littorinimorpha
- Family: Eulimidae
- Genus: Eulima
- Species: E. iota

Binomial name
- Eulima iota A. Adams, 1861

Synonyms
- Leiostraca iota (C. B. Adams, 1852) ·; Melanella (Balcis) iota (C. B. Adams, 1852)

= Eulima iota =

Species of gastropod

Eulima iota is a species of sea snail, a marine gastropod mollusk in the family Eulimidae. The species is one of a number within the genus Eulima.

== Description ==
The length of the shell attains 1.7 mm, its diameter 0.6 mm.

The shell is very small and doubly flexed, and it is semitranslucent and polished. The early whorls are slightly rounded, while the later ones are flat and scarcely marked by lines of growth. The suture is well marked. The periphery of the body whorl is obscurely angulated, and the base is short and well-rounded. The aperture is moderately large, with its posterior angle acute. The outer lip is thin, and the inner lip is fractured (reconstructing from the preceding whorls, we may say that it is concavely curved, reflected over, and appressed to the base).
