= Eulima politissima =

Scientific classification
- Kingdom: Animalia
- Phylum: Mollusca
- Class: Gastropoda
- Subclass: Caenogastropoda
- Order: Littorinimorpha
- Family: Eulimidae
- Genus: Eulima
- Species: †E. politissima

Binomial name
- †Eulima politissima Newton, 1895

Synonyms
- † Eulima polygyra A. Adams, 1851 (invalid: junior primary homonym of † Eulima polygyra Charlesworth, 1851); † Melanella polygyra A. Adams, 1851

Species of gastropod

Eulima politissima is an extinct species of sea snail, a marine gastropod mollusk in the family Eulimidae. The species is one of a number within the genus Eulima.
