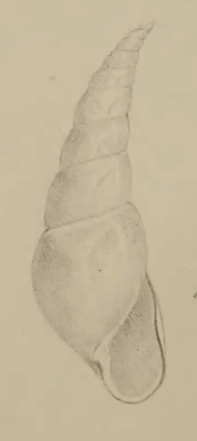
- Shell of Melanella adamantina (original image)

Scientific classification
- Kingdom: Animalia
- Phylum: Mollusca
- Class: Gastropoda
- Subclass: Caenogastropoda
- Order: Littorinimorpha
- Family: Eulimidae
- Genus: Melanella
- Species: M. adamantina

Binomial name
- Melanella adamantina (de Folin, 1867)

Synonyms
- Balcis adamantina (de Folin, 1867); Eulima adamantina de Folin, 1867

= Melanella adamantina =

Species of gastropod

Melanella adamantina is a species of sea snail, a marine gastropod mollusk in the family Eulimidae. The species is one of a number within the genus Melanella.

First described by Léopold de Folin in 1867 and named by him as Eulima adamantina. Type specimen collected in Panama.

== Description ==
(Original description in French) The shell is very elongate. Although the apex is slightly obtuse, the overall elongation of the shell makes it appear sharply pointed. It is crystalline, extremely diaphanous, and highly lustrous.

The shell consists of nine whorls, which initially increase in size slowly. Together, they form a pronounced curvature from right to left: the right side is concave, whereas the left side is convex. The whorls are joined by a simple suture that appears as a very fine and sharply defined line.

The transparency of the shell makes it possible to discern the basal plane of each whorl. This plane slightly thickens the shell wall within a very narrow margin both above and below the suture. The body whorl accounts for approximately one-third of the shell’s total length and is imperforate.

The aperture is elongate and semicircular. Its margins are simple, closely joined, and almost sharp-edged. The left margin is slightly reflected and curves around onto the columella.

== Distribution ==
This marine species occurs off Panama.
