= Melanella bipartita =

Scientific classification
- Kingdom: Animalia
- Phylum: Mollusca
- Class: Gastropoda
- Subclass: Caenogastropoda
- Order: Littorinimorpha
- Family: Eulimidae
- Genus: Melanella
- Species: M. bipartita

Binomial name
- Melanella bipartita (Mörch, 1860)

Synonyms
- Balcis bipartita (Mörch, 1860); Eulima bipartita Mörch, 1859; Strombiformis (Balcis) bipartita Mörch, 1859

Species of gastropod

Melanella bipartita is a species of sea snail, a marine gastropod mollusk in the family Eulimidae. The species is one of a number within the genus Melanella .

== Description ==
The length of the shell attains 7.5 mm, its diameter 2.5 mm.

The shell is shining and diaphanous It is flexed to the right. It has 10 flattened whorls, which are divided by a spiral band situated a little below the middle, the upper band being white and the lower band milk-white. The body whorl is subangulated at the periphery. The aperture is piriform, with the outer lip arcuate and produced and the inner lip straight and bearing a callus. The parietal wall is covered with a moderately thick callus, which renders the peritreme complete. A series of impressed varices forms an oblique line on the right side.

== Distribution ==
This species occurs in the Pacific Ocean off Mexico, Costa Rica and Panama.
