= List of synonyms of Melanella =

This list with synonyms of Melanella relies on the taxonomy used in the World Register of Marine Species

- Melanella abreojosensis Bartsch, 1917: synonym of Oceanida abreojosensis (Bartsch, 1917) (unaccepted combination)
- Melanella aciculata (Pease, 1861): synonym of Melanella kahoolawensis Pilsbry, 1917 (junior homonym, of Melanella aciculata (I. Lea, 1833))
- Melanella acuta (G. B. Sowerby I, 1834): synonym of Hypermastus acutus (G. B. Sowerby I, 1834)
- Melanella alayoi Espinosa, Ortea & Magaña, 2001: synonym of Vitreolina alayoi (Espinosa, Ortea & Magaña, 2001)
- Melanella anceps (J. T. Marshall, 1901): synonym of Melanella frielei (H. K. Jordan, 1895)
- Melanella anglica (G. B. Sowerby I, 1834): synonym of Melanella alba (da Costa, 1778)
- Melanella anteflexa (Locard, 1891): synonym of Vitreolina antiflexa (Monterosato, 1884) (unjustified emendation)
- Melanella apheles (Tenison Woods, 1879): synonym of Melanella augur (Angas, 1865)
- Melanella araeosomae (T. Habe, 1992): synonym of Hypermastus araeosomae T. Habe, 1992 (superseded combination)
- Melanella arcuata (C. B. Adams, 1850): synonym of Vitreolina arcuata (C. B. Adams, 1850)
- Melanella asser Bartsch, 1915: synonym of Fusceulima asser (Bartsch, 1915)
- Melanella atypha (A. E. Verrill & K. J. Bush, 1900): synonym of Eulima atypha A. E. Verrill & K. J. Bush, 1900 (superseded combination)
- Melanella aurata S. Hirase, 1920: synonym of Vitreolina aurata (S. Hirase, 1920)
- Melanella bakeri (Bartsch, 1917): synonym of Pseudosabinella bakeri (Bartsch, 1917)
- † Melanella bartschi J. A. Gardner & Aldrich, 1919: synonym of † Melanella laevigata (H. C. Lea, 1843) (junior subjective synonym)
- Melanella bermudezi Pilsbry & Aguayo, 1933: synonym of Vitreolina bermudezi (Pilsbry & Aguayo, 1933)
- Melanella bibsae Nowell-Usticke, 1959: synonym of Scalenostoma subulatum (Broderip, 1832)
- Melanella brevis (Requien, 1848): synonym of Melanella boscii (Payraudeau, 1826)
- Melanella californica Bartsch, 1917: synonym of Hypermastus randolphi (Vanatta, 1900) (junior subjective synonym)
- Melanella capa (Bartsch, 1926): synonym of Melanella olssoni (Bartsch, 1924) (junior subjective synonym)
- Melanella capensis (Thiele, 1915): synonym of Curveulima capensis (Thiele, 1915) (superseded combination)
- Melanella carifa Bartsch, 1915: synonym of Curveulima carifa (Bartsch, 1915)
- Melanella chascanon (R. B. Watson, 1883): synonym of Eulima chascanon R. B. Watson, 1883:: synonym of Eulimacrostoma chascanon (R. B. Watson, 1883) (superseded combination)
- Melanella chaunax (R. B. Watson, 1883): synonym of Eulima chaunax R. B. Watson, 1883
- Melanella cinca Dall, 1927: synonym of Melanella sarissa (R. B. Watson, 1883) (junior subjective synonym)
- Melanella clypeastericola (T. Habe, 1976): synonym of Clypeastericola clypeastericola (T. Habe, 1976) (superseded combination)
- Melanella columbiana Bartsch, 1917: synonym of Vitreolina columbiana (Bartsch, 1917)
- Melanella comatulicola (Graff, 1875): synonym of Crinophtheiros comatulicola (Graff, 1875) (unaccepted > superseded combination)
- Melanella compsa (A. E. Verrill & K. J. Bush, 1900): synonym of Eulima compsa A. E. Verrill & K. J. Bush, 1900 (superseded combination)
- Melanella corrida Dall, 1927: synonym of Melanella abida Dall, 1927
- Melanella crossei (Brusina, 1886): synonym of Eulima crossei Brusina, 1886
- Melanella cylindrata (R. B. Watson, 1883): synonym of Eulima cylindrata R. B. Watson, 1883
- Melanella delmontensis (A. G. Smith & M. Gordon, 1948): synonym of Eulima thersites P. P. Carpenter, 1864: synonym of Melanella thersites (P. P. Carpenter, 1864)
- Melanella dilecta (E. A. Smith, 1899): synonym of Parvioris dilecta (E. A. Smith, 1899)
- Melanella dufresnei [sic]: synonym of Melanella dufresnii Bowdich, 1822 (misspelling)
- † Melanella eborea (Conrad, 1846): synonym of † Melanella laevigata (H. C. Lea, 1843) (junior subjective synonym)
- Melanella farica Bartsch, 1915: synonym of Oceanida farica (Bartsch, 1915) (superseded combination)
- Melanella fernandinae Dall, 1927: synonym of Bathycrinicola fernandinae (Dall, 1927) (original combination)
- Melanella fuscopunctata (E. A. Smith, 1890): synonym of Sticteulima fuscopunctata (E. A. Smith, 1890)
- Melanella gigas (Kuroda & Habe, 1950): synonym of Melanella teinostoma (A. Adams, 1854)
- Melanella gomphus (R. B. Watson, 1883): synonym of Eulima gomphus R. B. Watson, 1883 (superseded combination)
- Melanella guildingii (A. Adams, 1854): synonym of Vitreobalcis nutans (Megerle von Mühlfeld, 1824)
- Melanella helena Thiele, 1930: synonym of Melanella kahoolawensis Pilsbry, 1917 (junior subjective synonym)
- Melanella holothuricola Adam, 1934: synonym of Peasistilifer nitidula (Pease, 1861)
- Melanella hyalina (R. B. Watson, 1883): synonym of Halielloides hyalina (R. B. Watson, 1883) (superseded combination)
- Melanella icafra Bartsch, 1915: synonym of Curveulima icafra (Bartsch, 1915)
- Melanella inconspicua (R. B. Watson, 1897): synonym of Eulima inconspicua R. B. Watson, 1897
- Melanella inflexa (Blainville, 1825): synonym of Melanella dufresnii Bowdich, 1822
- Melanella inflexa (Pease, 1868): synonym of Parvioris inflexa (Pease, 1868)
- Melanella intermedia (Cantraine, 1835): synonym of Melanella polita (Linnaeus, 1758) ( junior subjective synonym)
- Melanella iota Bartsch, 1915: synonym of Melanella iotoides Bartsch, 1916 (replaced by Melanella iotoides Bartsch, 1916 on account of secondary homonymy with Eulima iota C. B. Adams 1852)
- Melanella irafca Bartsch, 1915: synonym of Hemiliostraca irafca (Bartsch, 1915)
- Melanella iredalei (Laseron, 1955): synonym of Melanella acicula (A. A. Gould, 1849) (junior subjective synonym)
- Melanella jamaicensis (C. B. Adams, 1845): synonym of Melanella eburnea (Megerle von Mühlfeld, 1824)
- Melanella kawamurai (Kuroda & T. Habe, 1950): synonym of Amamibalcis kawamurai Kuroda & T. Habe, 1950 (superseded combination)
- Melanella kyurokusinensis (Nomura & Hatai, 1940): synonym of Melanella odontoidea (A. Adams, 1861)
- Melanella laevis (Pennant, 1777): synonym of Eulima glabra (da Costa, 1778) (dubious synonym)
- Melanella lampra Melvill, 1918: synonym of Oceanida lampra (Melvill, 1918) (superseded combination)
- Melanella langleyi (G. B. Sowerby III, 1892): synonym of Eulima langleyi G. B. Sowerby III, 1892
- Melanella laseroni Hedley, 1916: synonym of Melanella solitaria (E. A. Smith, 1915) (superseded combination)
- Melanella lineata (Monterosato, 1869): synonym of Fusceulima lineata (Monterosato, 1869)
- Melanella lutea Rodrìguez Garcìa del Castillo, 2000: synonym of Melanella trunca (R. B. Watson, 1897) (junior subjective synonym)
- Melanella mabutii Nomura & Hatai, 1935: synonym of Parvioris fulvescens (A. Adams, 1854) (superseded combination)
- Melanella macra Bartsch, 1917: synonym of Vitreolina macra (Bartsch, 1917)
- Melanella maracuya Espinosa, Ortea & Magaña, 2001: synonym of Vitreolina maracuya (Espinosa, Ortea & Magaña, 2001)
- Melanella marginata (Tenison Woods, 1879): synonym of Melanella augur (Angas, 1865)
- Melanella mayi (Tate, 1900): synonym of Melanella augur (Angas, 1865) (junior subjective synonym)
- Melanella medipacifica Pilsbry, 1917: synonym of Melanella cumingii (A. Adams, 1854)
- Melanella murrayae (Cotton & Godfrey, 1932): synonym of Melanella augur (Angas, 1865)
- Melanella nitidula (A. Adams, 1854): synonym of Eulima adamsii G. B. Sowerby II, 1866
- Melanella nutans (Megerle von Mühlfeld, 1824): synonym of Vitreobalcis nutans (Megerle von Mühlfeld, 1824)
- Melanella obtusa (Jeffreys, 1884): synonym of Melanella obtusoapicata Bouchet & Warén, 1986
- Melanella oldroydi Bartsch, 1917: synonym of Melanella oldroydae Bartsch, 1917 (incorrect gender ending for a species name dedicated to a woman)
- Melanella orthopleura (Tate, 1898): synonym of Melanella augur (Angas, 1865)
- Melanella panamensis Bartsch, 1917: synonym of Eulimostraca burragei (Bartsch, 1917)
- Melanella paxillus (A. Adams, 1861): synonym of Eulima pura (A. Adams, 1861) (junior subjective synonym)
- Melanella peronellicola (Kuroda & T. Habe, 1950): synonym of Hypermastus peronellicola (Kuroda & T. Habe, 1950) (superseded combination)
- Melanella perversa (K. J. Bush, 1909) (nomen nudum)
- Melanella picta (G. B. Sowerby II, 1866): synonym of Melanella cumingii (A. Adams, 1854)
- Melanella pisorum (Pilsbry, 1917): synonym of Melanella acicula (A. A. Gould, 1849) (junior subjective synonym)
- Melanella planicincta (Cotton & Godfrey, 1932): synonym of Melanella augur (Angas, 1865) (junior subjective synonym)
- Melanella platyacme (Sykes, 1903): synonym of Melanella jeffreysii (Tryon, 1886)
- Melanella polygyra (A. Adams, 1854): synonym of† Eulima politissima R. B. Newton, 1895
- Melanella porcellana (A. Adams, 1851): synonym of Melanella alba (da Costa, 1778)
- Melanella portlandica Bartsch, 1927: synonym of Melanella thersites (P. P. Carpenter, 1864) (junior subjective synonym)
- Melanella proxima (G. B. Sowerby II, 1866): synonym of Melanella augur (Angas, 1865) (junior synonym)
- Melanella psila (R. B. Watson, 1883): synonym of Eulima psila R. B. Watson, 1883 (unaccepted > superseded combination)
- Melanella pyramidalis (G. B. Sowerby II, 1866): synonym of Leiostraca pyramidalis G. B. Sowerby II, 1866
- Melanella randolphi (Vanatta, 1900): synonym of Hypermastus randolphi (Vanatta, 1900) (superseded combination)
- Melanella recta (Réquien, 1849): synonym of Melanella polita (Linnaeus, 1758)
- Melanella recurva (O. Boettger, 1893): synonym of Eulima recurva O. Boettger, 1893
- Melanella robillardiana Pilsbry, 1917: synonym of Melanella dufresnii Bowdich, 1822
- Melanella rosa Willett, 1944: synonym of Hypermastus rosa (Willett, 1944)
- Melanella rossinsulae (Preston, 1916): synonym of Melanella attenuata (G. B. Sowerby II, 1866)
- Melanella rubrotincta (Jeffreys, 1867): synonym of Melanella polita (Linnaeus, 1758)
- Melanella rutila (P. P. Carpenter, 1864): synonym of Polygireulima rutila (P. P. Carpenter, 1864)
