= Melanella orthophyes =

- Shell of Melanella orthophyes

Scientific classification
- Kingdom: Animalia
- Phylum: Mollusca
- Class: Gastropoda
- Subclass: Caenogastropoda
- Order: Littorinimorpha
- Superfamily: Vanikoroidea
- Family: Eulimidae
- Genus: Melanella
- Species: M. orthophyes

Binomial name
- Melanella orthophyes (Sturany, 1903)

Synonyms
- Eulima orthophyes Sturany, 1903 (original combination)

Species of gastropod

566141 Melanellaorthophyes is a species of sea snail, a marine gastropod mollusk in the family Eulimidae.

== Description ==
(Original description in German)The smooth, strongly glossy, white-colored shell is almost straight in its growth, and the apex is only slightly inclined to the right. There are 11 whorls, which are separated from one another by a thread-like suture. The shell measures 7.4 × 2.6 mm, and the aperture is approximately 2.5 mm high.

In its shape, the new species bears a certain resemblance to Stilifer acicula A. A. Gould, 1849, synonym of Melanella acicula (A. A. Gould, 1849). In its shell structure, it also resembles Eulima solidula A. Adams & Reeve, 1850, synonym of Melanella solidula (A. Adams & Reeve, 1850) from Hawaii (Berlin Museum).

== Distribution ==
This species occurs in the Red Sea.
