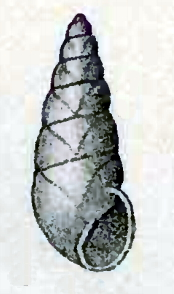
- Drawing of a shell of Vitreolina perminima

Scientific classification
- Kingdom: Animalia
- Phylum: Mollusca
- Class: Gastropoda
- Subclass: Caenogastropoda
- Order: Littorinimorpha
- Family: Eulimidae
- Genus: Vitreolina; Monterosato, 1884

Type species
- Eulima incurva Bucquoy, Dautzenberg & Dollfus, 1883

Synonyms
- Balcis (Vitreolina) Monterosato, 1884; Eulima (Vitreolina) Monterosato, 1884

= Vitreolina =

Genus of gastropods

Vitreolina is a genus of very small parasitic sea snails, marine gastropod mollusks or micromollusks in the Eulimidae family.

This genus was first described by Monterosato in 1884. He proposed it as a section in the family Eulimidae for some of the Mediterranean species. It contains the small vitreous species without internal varices, with curved spire and slightly obtuse apex.

== Species ==
Species within the genus Vitreolina include:

- Vitreolina alayoi Espinosa, Ortea & Magaña, 2001
- Vitreolina antiflexa Monterosato, 1884
- Vitreolina arcuata C. B. Adams, 1850
- Vitreolina aurata Hirase, 1920
- Vitreolina bermudezi Pilsbry & Aguayo, 1933
- Vitreolina chondrocidaricola Warén, B. L. Burch & T. A. Burch, 1984
- Vitreolina cionella Monterosato, 1878
- Vitreolina colini Espinosa & Ortea, 2006
- Vitreolina columbiana Bartsch, 1917
- Vitreolina commensalis Tate, 1898
- Vitreolina conica C. B. Adams, 1850
- Vitreolina curva Monterosato, 1874
- Vitreolina drangai (Hertlein & Strong, 1951)
- Vitreolina edwardsi Cotton & Godfrey, 1932
- † Vitreolina erronea (Cossmann, 1904)
- Vitreolina hawaiiensis Warén, B. L. Burch & T. A. Burch, 1984
- Vitreolina inconspicua Turton, 1932
- Vitreolina incurva Bucquoy, Dautzenberg & Dollfus, 1883 (Type taxon)
- Vitreolina knudseni Bouchet & Warén, 1986
- Vitreolina macra Bartsch, 1917
- Vitreolina maracuya Espinosa, Ortea & Magaña, 2001
- Vitreolina parfaiti de Folin, 1887
- Vitreolina perminima Jeffreys, 1883
- Vitreolina philippi de Rayneval & Ponzi, 1854
- Vitreolina rhaeba Melvill, 1906
- † Vitreolina subbrevis (A. d'Orbigny, 1852)
- Vitreolina subconica E. A. Smith, 1890
- Vitreolina titubans Berry, 1956
- Vitreolina wareni Rehder, 1980
- Vitreolina yod Carpenter, 1857

Species brought into synonymy

- Vitreolina akauni Habe, 1952: synonym of Eulitoma akauni (Habe, 1952)
- Vitreolina dautzenbergi (Pallary, 1900): synonym of Curveulima dautzenbergi (Pallary, 1900)
- Vitreolina devians Monterosato, 1884: synonym of Curveulima devians (Monterosato, 1884)
- Vitreolina incurvata [sic]: synonym of Vitreolina incurva (Bucquoy, Dautzenberg & Dollfus, 1883)
- Vitreolina levantina Oliverio, Buzzurro & Villa, 1994: synonym of Melanella levantina (Oliverio, Buzzurro & Villa, 1994)
- Vitreolina nishimurai Habe, 1958 : synonym of Eulitoma nishimurai (Habe, 1958)
- Vitreolina petitiana (Brusina, 1869): synonym of Melanella petitiana (Brusina, 1869)
- Vitreolina philippii (Rayneval & Ponzi, 1854): synonym of Vitreolina philippi (de Rayneval & Ponzi, 1854)

Taxon inquirendum

- Vitreolina kowiensis (Turton, 1932)
