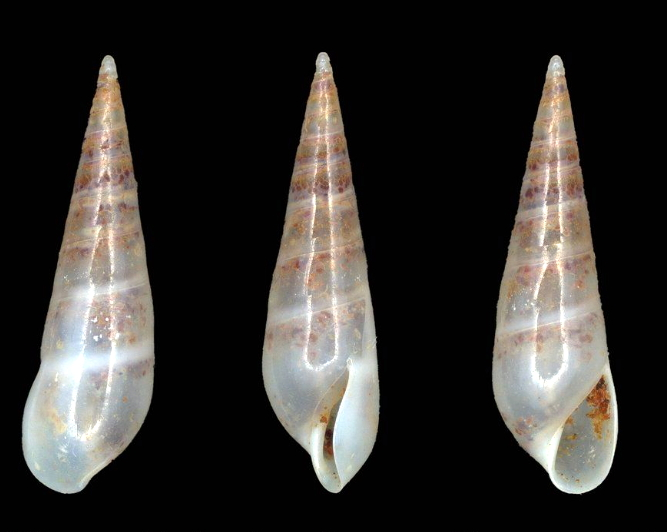
- Shell of Polygireulima rutila(specimen at the Denver Museum of Nature & Science)

Scientific classification
- Kingdom: Animalia
- Phylum: Mollusca
- Class: Gastropoda
- Subclass: Caenogastropoda
- Order: Littorinimorpha
- Family: Eulimidae
- Genus: Polygireulima; Sacco, 1892

Synonyms
- Acicularia Monterosato, 1884 (Invalid: junior homonym of Acicularia d'Archiac, 1837 [Porifera] and several others); Eulima (Polygireulima) Sacco, 1892 superseded rank; Eulima (Polygyreulima) [sic] misspelling - incorrect subsequent spelling; Melanella (Polygyreulima) [sic] misspelling - incorrect subsequent spelling; Polygyreulima misspelling - incorrect subsequent spelling (incorrect subsequent spelling of...); Strombiformis (Polygireulima) Sacco, 1892 superseded rank

= Polygireulima =

Genus of gastropods

Polygireulima is a genus of very small parasitic sea snails, marine gastropod mollusks or micromollusks in the Eulimidae family.

This genus was first described as Acicularia by Monterosato in 1884, a name ruled invalid as a homonym of several prior names. In 1984, Anders Warén's "A generic revision of the family Eulimidae (Gastropoda, Prosobranchia)" synonymised Acicularia with Federico Sacco's 1892 description of Polygireulima.

== Species ==
Species within the Polygireulima genera include:

- † Polygireulima acumen (Deshayes, 1862)
- † Polygireulima acuncula (Deshayes, 1862)
- † Polygireulima deshayesi (Cossmann, 1888)
- Polygireulima glabella (S. V. Wood, 1848)
- † Polygireulima montilysensis (Bałuk, 1995)
- Polygireulima rutila Carpenter, 1864
- † Polygireulima spina (Grateloup, 1838)
- † Polygireulima subimbricata (Cossmann, 1888)
- † Polygireulima subnitida (A. d'Orbigny, 1850)

Species brought into synonymy

- Polygireulima amblytera Verrill & Bush, 1900: synonym of Melanella amblytera (Verrill & Bush, 1900)

A parasite of echinoderms, existing in subtidal habitats in the Atlantic Ocean and Caribbean Sea.

- Polygireulima monterosatoi (Monterosato, 1890): synonym of Melanella pyramidalis (G. B. Sowerby II, 1866)
- Polygireulima polita (Linnaeus, 1758): synonym of Melanella polita (Linnaeus, 1758)
- Polygireulima sinuosa (Scacchi, 1836): synonym of Melanella polita (Linnaeus, 1758) (junior subjective synonym, and superseded combination)
