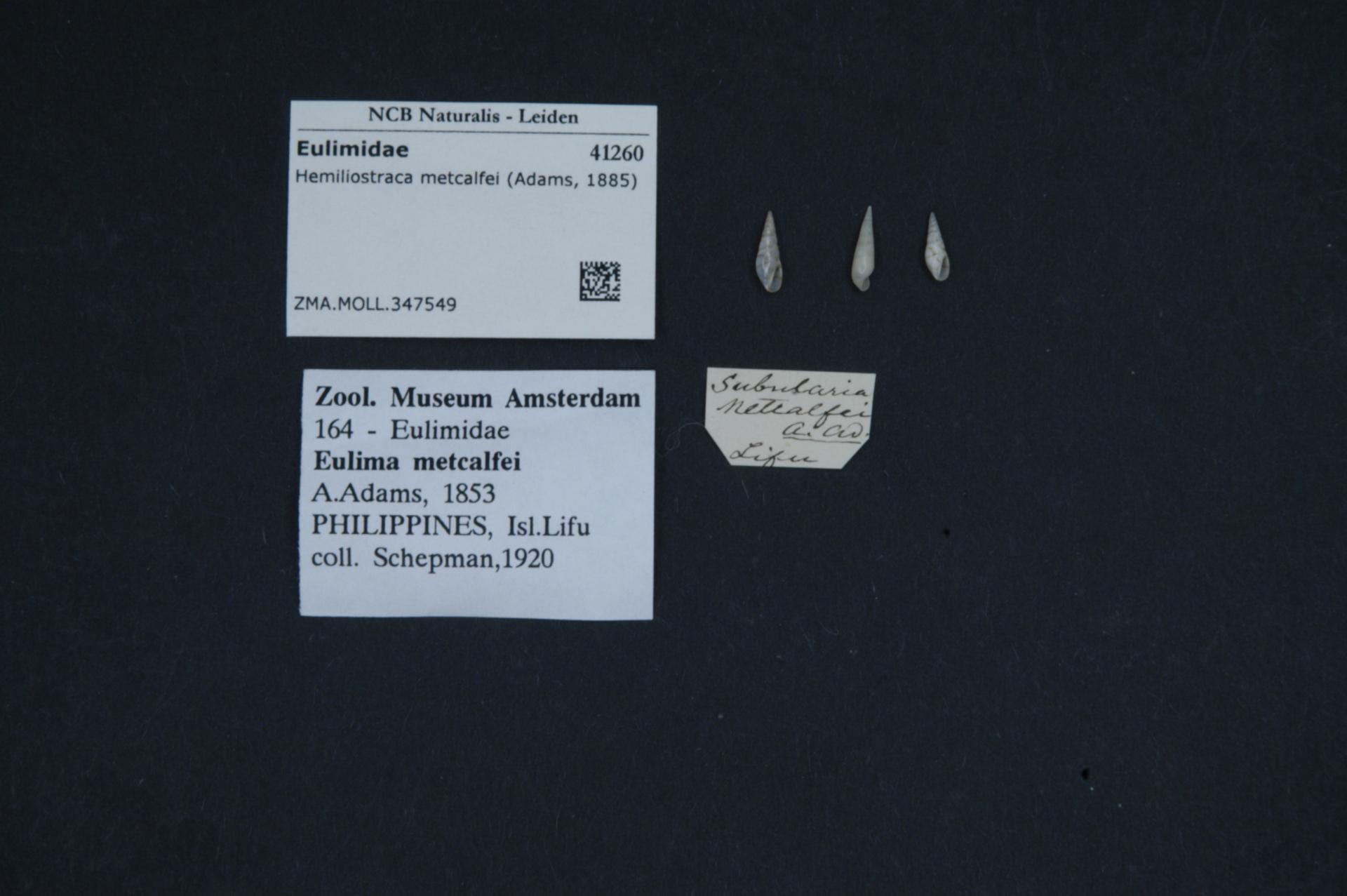

Scientific classification
- Kingdom: Animalia
- Phylum: Mollusca
- Class: Gastropoda
- Subclass: Caenogastropoda
- Order: Littorinimorpha
- Family: Eulimidae
- Genus: Hemiliostraca; Pilsbry, 1917

Type species
- Leiostraca distorta Pease, 1860

Synonyms
- Eulimitra Laseron, 1955

= Hemiliostraca =

Genus of molluscs

Hemiliostraca is a genus of sea snails, marine gastropod mollusks in the family Eulimidae.

== Species ==
Species within this genus include the following:

- Hemiliostraca auricincta (Abbott, 1958)
- Hemiliostraca bahamondei (Rehder, 1980)
- Hemiliostraca clarimaculosa (Raines, 2003)
- Hemiliostraca conspurcata (A. Adams, 1864)
- Hemiliostraca delicata (Pilsbry, 1918)
- Hemiliostraca diauges (Tomlin & Shackleford, 1915)
- Hemiliostraca elegantissima (de Folin, 1867)
- Hemiliostraca fasciata Matsuda, Uyeno & Nagasawa, 2013
- Hemiliostraca irafca (Bartsch, 1915)
- Hemiliostraca joshuana (Gatliff & Gabriel, 1910)
- Hemiliostraca metcalfei (A. Adams, 1853)
- Hemiliostraca montrouzieri (Souverbie, 1872)
- Hemiliostraca ophiarachnicola Matsuda, Uyeno & Nagasawa, 2013
- Hemiliostraca peasei (Tryon, 1886)
- Hemiliostraca samoensis (Crosse, 1867)
- Hemiliostraca sloani (Warén, 1980)
- Hemiliostraca sobrina (Laseron, 1955)
- Hemiliostraca vittata (Laseron, 1955)
- Hemiliostraca waltersi (Laseron, 1955)

Species brought into synonymy

- Hemiliostraca acanthyllis (Watson, 1883): synonym of Melanella acanthyllis (R. B. Watson, 1883)
- Hemiliostraca distorta (Pease, 1860): synonym of Hemiliostraca peasei (Tryon, 1886)
- Hemiliostraca osorioae (Raines, 2003): synonym of Subniso osorioae Raines, 2003
- Hemiliostraca perspicua (Oliver, 1915): synonym of Eulima perspicua (W. R. B. Oliver, 1915)
- Hemiliostraca vitrea (Petterd, 1884): synonym of Eulima lodderae (Tate MS, Lodder, 1900)

Taxon inquirendum

- Hemiliostraca amamiensis (Habe, 1961)
