= Melanella distorta =

- Shell of Melanella distorta (specimen at MNHN, Paris)

Scientific classification
- Kingdom: Animalia
- Phylum: Mollusca
- Class: Gastropoda
- Subclass: Caenogastropoda
- Order: Littorinimorpha
- Family: Eulimidae
- Genus: Melanella
- Species: †M. distorta

Binomial name
- †Melanella distorta (Defrance, 1823)

Synonyms
- † Eulima subemarginata Deshayes, 1862; † Melania distorta Defrance, 1823 superseded combination

Species of gastropod

Melanella distorta is an extinct species of sea snail, a marine gastropod mollusk in the family Eulimidae. The species is one of a number within the genus Melanella.

== Description ==
(Original description in French) This species bears a strong resemblance to Melania nitida (Lamarck, 1804) (species inquirendum) in its gloss; but it differs essentially from it by its curvature and by a longitudinal line found on each of the whorls. These lines are located on the right side of the shell, and, without corresponding exactly to one another, they form an oblique line from the apex to the upper part of the aperture.

The individuals of this species found at Grignon are approx. 6–9 mm in length; but specimens from the vicinity of Angers are approx. 15–18 mm in length. In Weymouth Bay, a shell is found that perfectly resembles the latter and must be its living counterpart; it was described as Turbo politus (synonym of Melanella polita (Linnaeus, 1758)). This fossil species is also found at Dax.

== Distribution ==
Fossils of this marine species were found in Lutetian and Bartonian strata at Grignon and Dax, France.
