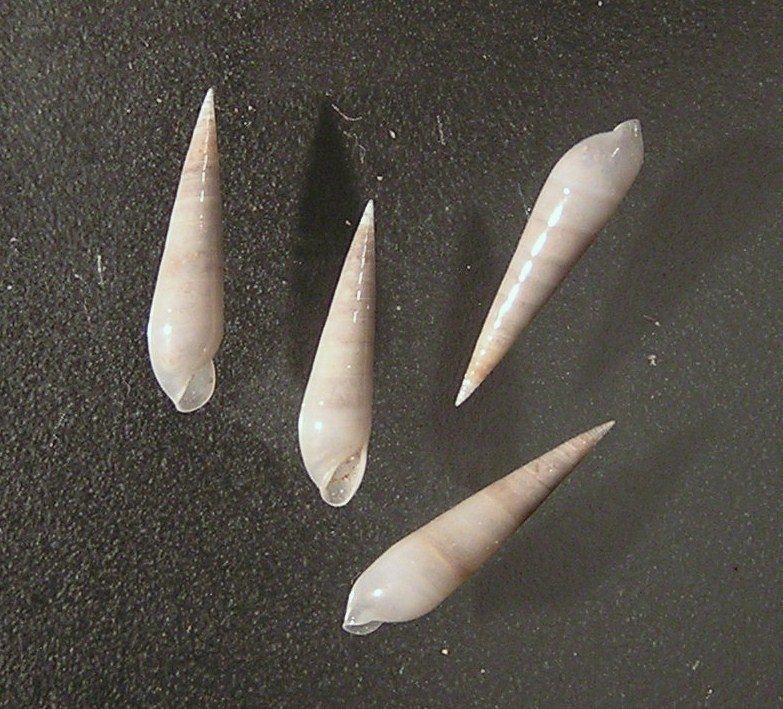
- Shells of Melanella hypsela

Scientific classification
- Kingdom: Animalia
- Phylum: Mollusca
- Class: Gastropoda
- Subclass: Caenogastropoda
- Order: Littorinimorpha
- Family: Eulimidae
- Genus: Melanella
- Species: M. hypsela

Binomial name
- Melanella hypsela Verrill & Bush, 1900

Synonyms
- Eulima hypsela Verrill & Bush, 1900; Eulima engonia Verrill & Bush, 1900; Melanella engonia Verrill & Bush, 1900

= Melanella hypsela =

Species of gastropod

Melanella hypsela is a species of sea snail, a marine gastropod mollusk in the family Eulimidae. The species is one of a number within the genus Melanella.

== Distribution ==
This species occurs in the following locations:

- Bermuda
- Bahamas
- West Indies
- Brazil (Trindade Island, Rio de Janeiro and Rio Grande do Sul)

== Description ==
The maximum recorded shell length is 8 mm., its diameter 2.5 mm.

(Original description) The shell is rather slender and very elongated, consisting of sixteen whorls in the adult, besides a very minute apical whorl. The whorls are very flat, so that the outlines of the spire are rectilinear. The suture is distinct and not impressed, being somewhat oblique (more so than in Melanella amblytera). The body whorl is evenly rounded, as well as somewhat produced and narrowed in front. The aperture is long-ovate, acute posteriorly, and obtusely rounded and somewhat flaring anteriorly and at the columellar margin, with its edge being strongly sinuous in a profile view.

The color is bluish-white, being slightly tinged with brown on the lower whorls and having a strong brown tint showing through by transparency on most of the upper whorls; it is sometimes pure white. The surface is smooth and brilliantly polished.

== Habitat ==
Minimum recorded depth is 15 m. Maximum recorded depth is 525 m.
