= Bathycrinicola nacraensis =

Scientific classification
- Kingdom: Animalia
- Phylum: Mollusca
- Class: Gastropoda
- Subclass: Caenogastropoda
- Order: Littorinimorpha
- Family: Eulimidae
- Genus: Bathycrinicola
- Species: B. nacraensis

Binomial name
- Bathycrinicola nacraensis Peñas & Giribet, 2003

Species of gastropod

Bathycrinicola nacraensis is a species of sea snail, a marine gastropod mollusc in the family Eulimidae.
