= Hemiliostraca bahamondei =

Scientific classification
- Kingdom: Animalia
- Phylum: Mollusca
- Class: Gastropoda
- Subclass: Caenogastropoda
- Order: Littorinimorpha
- Family: Eulimidae
- Genus: Hemiliostraca
- Species: H. bahamondei

Binomial name
- Hemiliostraca bahamondei Rehder, 1980

Species of gastropod

Hemiliostraca bahamondei is a species of sea snail, a marine gastropod mollusk in the family Eulimidae.
