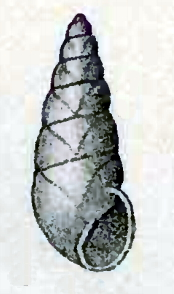
- Drawing of a shell of Vitreolina perminima

Scientific classification
- Kingdom: Animalia
- Phylum: Mollusca
- Class: Gastropoda
- Subclass: Caenogastropoda
- Order: Littorinimorpha
- Family: Eulimidae
- Genus: Vitreolina
- Species: V. perminima

Binomial name
- Vitreolina perminima (Jeffreys, 1883)

Synonyms
- Eulima perminima Jeffreys, 1883

= Vitreolina perminima =

Species of gastropod

Vitreolina perminima is a species of sea snail, a marine gastropod mollusk in the family Eulimidae. The species is one of a number within the genus Vitreolina.

== Distribution ==
This species occurs in the North Atlantic Ocean and in the Mediterranean Sea

== Description ==
This micromollusk measures only 1.25 mm long. The shell is slender and rather solid. It is semitransparent and white, lightly tinged with yellowish brown on the body whorl. The apex is bluntly pointed. The shell contains 6 to 7 whorls, compressed and compact.
