= Hemiliostraca delicata =

Scientific classification
- Kingdom: Animalia
- Phylum: Mollusca
- Class: Gastropoda
- Subclass: Caenogastropoda
- Order: Littorinimorpha
- Family: Eulimidae
- Genus: Hemiliostraca
- Species: H. delicata

Binomial name
- Hemiliostraca delicata Pilsbry, 1918

Synonyms
- Subularia delicata Pilsbry, 1918

Species of gastropod

Hemiliostraca delicata is a species of sea snail, a marine gastropod mollusk in the family Eulimidae.
