= Vitreolina curva =

Scientific classification
- Kingdom: Animalia
- Phylum: Mollusca
- Class: Gastropoda
- Subclass: Caenogastropoda
- Order: Littorinimorpha
- Family: Eulimidae
- Genus: Vitreolina
- Species: V. curva

Binomial name
- Vitreolina curva (Monterosato, 1874)

Synonyms
- Eulima curva Monterosato, 1874; Eulima distorta var. tumidosa Marshall, 1890

Species of gastropod

Vitreolina curva is a species of sea snail, a marine gastropod mollusk in the family Eulimidae. The species is one of a number within the genus Vitreolina .

== Distribution ==
This species occurs in the North Atlantic Ocean and in the Mediterranean Sea off Greece.
