= Vitreolina cionella =

Scientific classification
- Kingdom: Animalia
- Phylum: Mollusca
- Class: Gastropoda
- Subclass: Caenogastropoda
- Order: Littorinimorpha
- Family: Eulimidae
- Genus: Vitreolina
- Species: V. cionella

Binomial name
- Vitreolina cionella (Monterosato, 1878)

Synonyms
- Eulima cionella Monterosato, 1878

Species of gastropod

Vitreolina cionella is a species of sea snail, a marine gastropod mollusk in the family Eulimidae. The species is one of a number within the genus Vitreolina .

== Distribution ==
This species occurs in European waters in the North Atlantic Ocean.
