= Hemiliostraca peasei =

Scientific classification
- Kingdom: Animalia
- Phylum: Mollusca
- Class: Gastropoda
- Subclass: Caenogastropoda
- Order: Littorinimorpha
- Family: Eulimidae
- Genus: Hemiliostraca
- Species: H. peasei

Binomial name
- Hemiliostraca peasei Tryon, 1886

Synonyms
- Eulima peasei Tryon, 1886; Hemiliostraca distorta Pease, 1860; Leiostraca distorta Pease, 1860

Species of gastropod

Hemiliostraca peasei is a species of small sea snail, a marine gastropod mollusk in the family Eulimidae.

== Description ==
The shell measures approximately 8 mm in length.
