= Bathycrinicola curta =

Scientific classification
- Kingdom: Animalia
- Phylum: Mollusca
- Class: Gastropoda
- Subclass: Caenogastropoda
- Order: Littorinimorpha
- Family: Eulimidae
- Genus: Bathycrinicola
- Species: B. curta

Binomial name
- Bathycrinicola curta Warén, 1972

Synonyms
- Balcis curta Warén, 1972

Species of gastropod

Bathycrinicola curta is a species of sea snail, a marine gastropod mollusc in the family Eulimidae.

== Distribution ==
This species occurs in the following locations:

- European waters (ERMS scope)
- United Kingdom Exclusive Economic Zone
