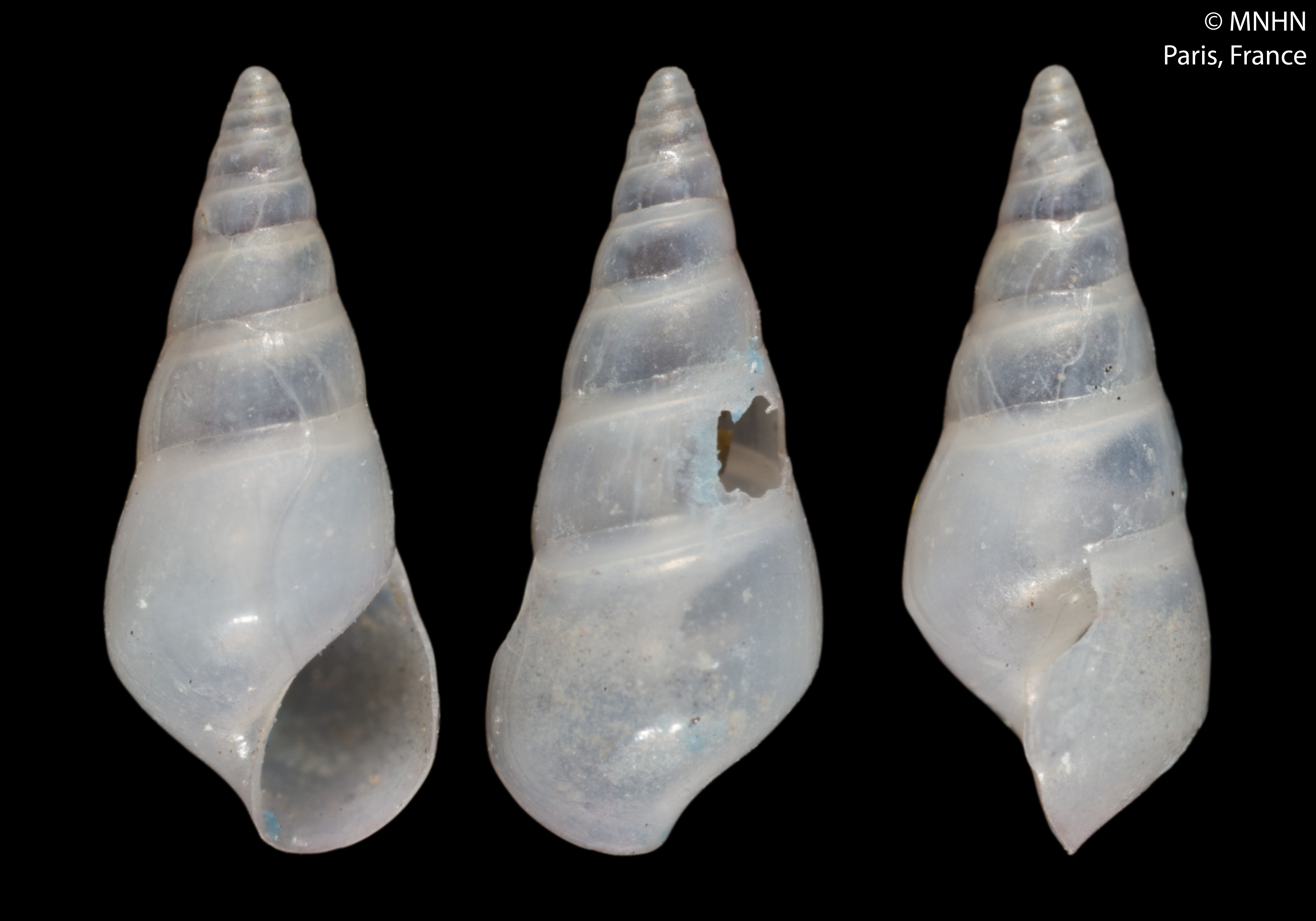
- Shell of Bathycrinicola macrapex (holotype at MNHN, Paris)

Scientific classification
- Kingdom: Animalia
- Phylum: Mollusca
- Class: Gastropoda
- Subclass: Caenogastropoda
- Order: Littorinimorpha
- Family: Eulimidae
- Genus: Bathycrinicola
- Species: B. macrapex

Binomial name
- Bathycrinicola macrapex Bouchet & Warén, 1986

= Bathycrinicola macrapex =

Species of gastropod

Bathycrinicola macrapex is a species of sea snail, a marine gastropod mollusc in the family Eulimidae.

== Distribution ==
This marine species occurs in the Gulf of Gascony.
