= Hemiliostraca clarimaculosa =

Scientific classification
- Kingdom: Animalia
- Phylum: Mollusca
- Class: Gastropoda
- Subclass: Caenogastropoda
- Order: Littorinimorpha
- Family: Eulimidae
- Genus: Hemiliostraca
- Species: H. clarimaculosa

Binomial name
- Hemiliostraca clarimaculosa Raines, 2003

Synonyms
- Eulima clarimaculosa Raines, 2003

Species of gastropod

Hemiliostraca clarimaculosa is a species of sea snail, a marine gastropod mollusk in the family Eulimidae.
