= Hemiliostraca sobrina =

Scientific classification
- Kingdom: Animalia
- Phylum: Mollusca
- Class: Gastropoda
- Subclass: Caenogastropoda
- Order: Littorinimorpha
- Family: Eulimidae
- Genus: Hemiliostraca
- Species: H. sobrina

Binomial name
- Hemiliostraca sobrina Laseron, 1955

Synonyms
- Cuspeulima sobrina Laseron, 1955

Species of gastropod

Hemiliostraca sobrina is a species of sea snail, a marine gastropod mollusk in the family Eulimidae.
