= Polygireulima deshayesi =

Polygireulima deshayesi Temporal range: Eocene

Scientific classification
- Kingdom: Animalia
- Phylum: Mollusca
- Class: Gastropoda
- Subclass: Caenogastropoda
- Order: Littorinimorpha
- Family: Eulimidae
- Genus: Polygireulima
- Species: †P. deshayesi

Binomial name
- †Polygireulima deshayesi (Cossmann, 1888)

Synonyms
- Eulima deshayesi Cossmann, 1888

Species of gastropod

Polygireulima deshayesi is an extinct species of sea snail in the family Eulimidae. It is known from the Eocene of Europe.
