= Vitreolina parfaiti =

Scientific classification
- Kingdom: Animalia
- Phylum: Mollusca
- Class: Gastropoda
- Subclass: Caenogastropoda
- Order: Littorinimorpha
- Family: Eulimidae
- Genus: Vitreolina
- Species: V. parfaiti

Binomial name
- Vitreolina parfaiti (de Folin, 1887)

Synonyms
- Eulima parfaiti de Folin, 1884

Species of gastropod

Vitreolina parfaiti is a species of sea snail, a marine gastropod mollusk in the family Eulimidae.

== Distribution ==
This species occurs in the Atlantic Ocean off the Canary Islands
