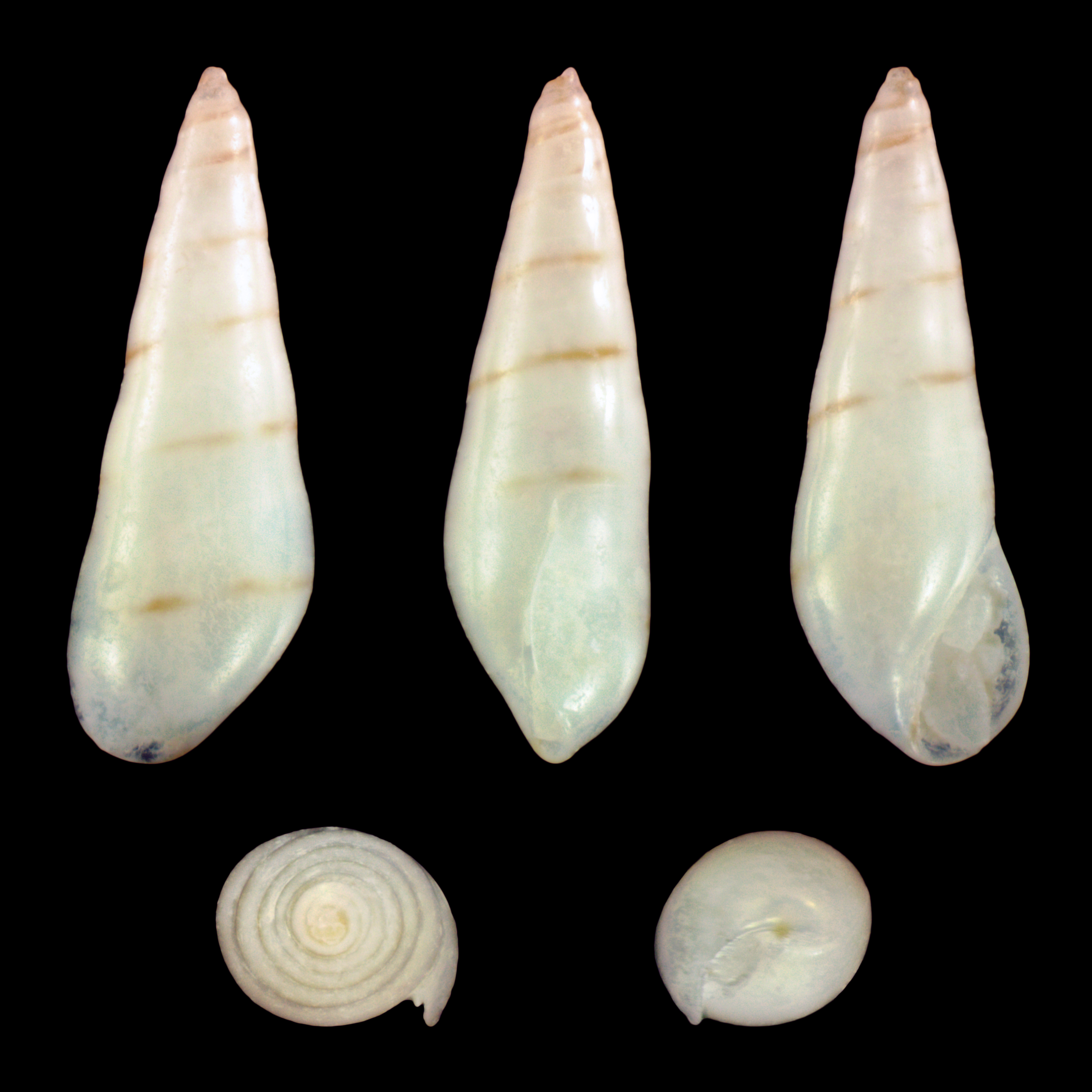

Scientific classification
- Kingdom: Animalia
- Phylum: Mollusca
- Class: Gastropoda
- Subclass: Caenogastropoda
- Order: Littorinimorpha
- Family: Eulimidae
- Genus: Hemiliostraca
- Species: H. metcalfei

Binomial name
- Hemiliostraca metcalfei A. Adams, 1853

Synonyms
- Leiostraca metcalfei A. Adams, 1853

= Hemiliostraca metcalfei =

Species of gastropod

Hemiliostraca metcalfei is a species of sea snail, a marine gastropod mollusk in the family Eulimidae.
