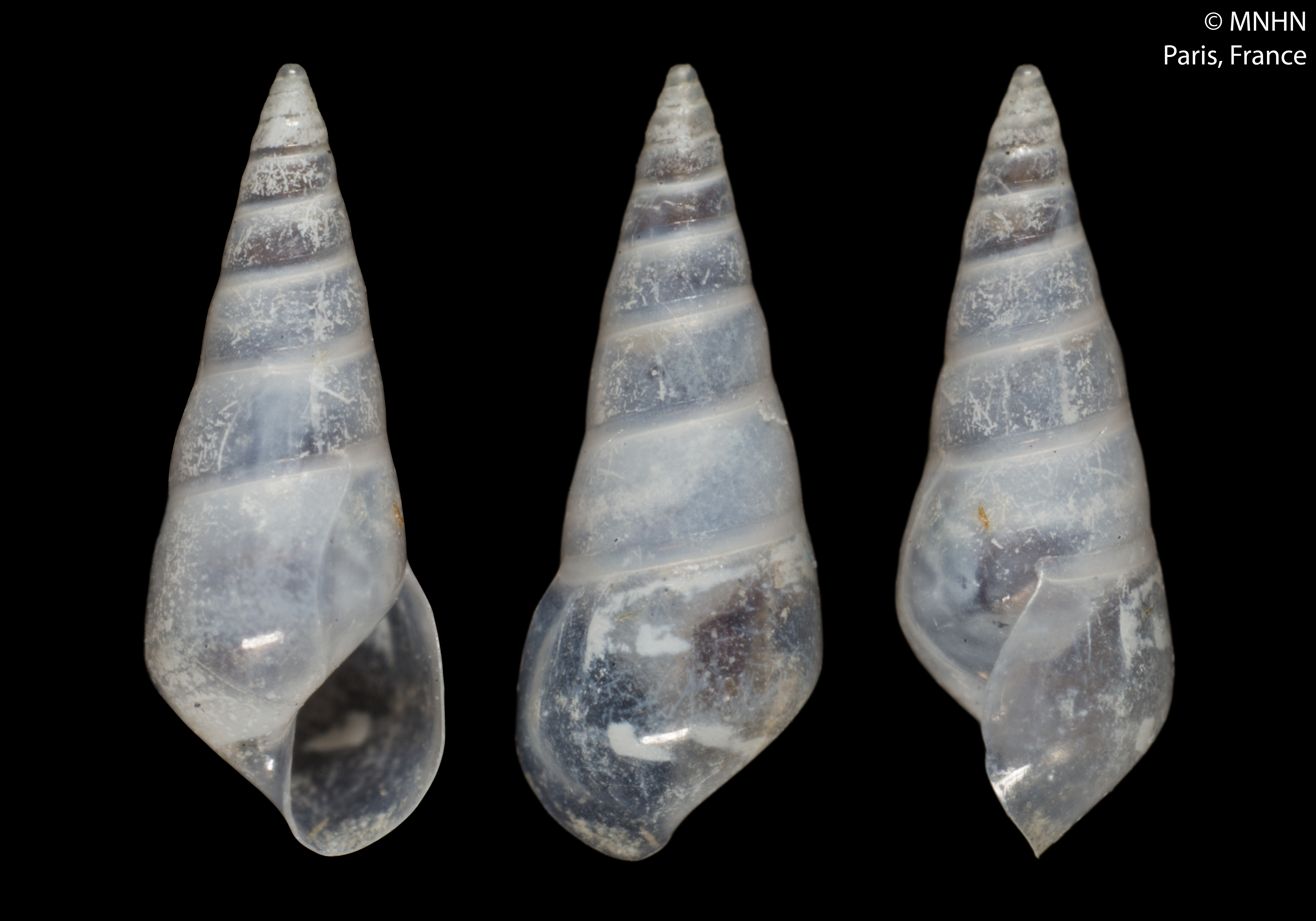
- Shell of Bathycrinicola micrapex (holotype at MNHN, Paris)

Scientific classification
- Kingdom: Animalia
- Phylum: Mollusca
- Class: Gastropoda
- Subclass: Caenogastropoda
- Order: Littorinimorpha
- Family: Eulimidae
- Genus: Bathycrinicola
- Species: B. micrapex

Binomial name
- Bathycrinicola micrapex Bouchet & Warén, 1986

= Bathycrinicola micrapex =

Species of gastropod

Bathycrinicola micrapex is a species of sea snail, a marine gastropod mollusc in the family Eulimidae.

== Distribution ==
This species is distributed in the following locations:

- European waters (ERMS scope) (Gulf of Gascony)
- United Kingdom Exclusive Economic Zone
