= Bathycrinicola talaena =

Scientific classification
- Kingdom: Animalia
- Phylum: Mollusca
- Class: Gastropoda
- Subclass: Caenogastropoda
- Order: Littorinimorpha
- Family: Eulimidae
- Genus: Bathycrinicola
- Species: B. talaena

Binomial name
- Bathycrinicola talaena (Dautzenberg & Fischer H., 1897)

Synonyms
- Eulima talaena Dautzenberg & Fischer H., 1896

Species of gastropod

Bathycrinicola talaena is a species of sea snail, a marine gastropod mollusc in the family Eulimidae.

== Distribution ==
This marine species occurs in the following locations:

- European waters (ERMS scope)
- United Kingdom Exclusive Economic Zone
