= Hemiliostraca conspurcata =

Scientific classification
- Kingdom: Animalia
- Phylum: Mollusca
- Class: Gastropoda
- Subclass: Caenogastropoda
- Order: Littorinimorpha
- Family: Eulimidae
- Genus: Hemiliostraca
- Species: H. conspurcata

Binomial name
- Hemiliostraca conspurcata A. Adams, 1864

Synonyms
- Leiostraca conspurcata A. Adams, 1864

Species of gastropod

Hemiliostraca conspurcata is a species of sea snail, a marine gastropod mollusk in the family Eulimidae.
