= Hemiliostraca joshuana =

Scientific classification
- Kingdom: Animalia
- Phylum: Mollusca
- Class: Gastropoda
- Subclass: Caenogastropoda
- Order: Littorinimorpha
- Family: Eulimidae
- Genus: Hemiliostraca
- Species: H. joshuana

Binomial name
- Hemiliostraca joshuana Gatliff & Gabriel, 1910

Synonyms
- Leiostraca joshuana Gatliff & Gabriel, 1910

Species of gastropod

Hemiliostraca joshuana is a species of sea snail, a marine gastropod mollusk in the family Eulimidae.
