= Hemiliostraca auricincta =

Scientific classification
- Kingdom: Animalia
- Phylum: Mollusca
- Class: Gastropoda
- Subclass: Caenogastropoda
- Order: Littorinimorpha
- Family: Eulimidae
- Genus: Hemiliostraca
- Species: H. auricincta

Binomial name
- Hemiliostraca auricincta (Abbott, 1958)

Synonyms
- Eulima auricincta (Abbott, 1958); Strombiformis auricincta Abbott, 1958

Species of gastropod

Hemiliostraca auricincta is a species of sea snail, a marine gastropod mollusk in the family Eulimidae.

== Distribution ==
This marine species occurs off the following locations:

- Aruba
- Belize
- Bonaire
- Caribbean Sea
- Cayman Islands
- Colombia
- Costa Rica
- Cuba
- Curaçao
- Gulf of Mexico
- Lesser Antilles
- Mexico
- Puerto Rico

== Description ==
The maximum recorded shell length is 4.9 mm.

== Habitat ==
Minimum recorded depth is 0 m. Maximum recorded depth is 183 m.
