= Hemiliostraca diauges =

Scientific classification
- Kingdom: Animalia
- Phylum: Mollusca
- Class: Gastropoda
- Subclass: Caenogastropoda
- Order: Littorinimorpha
- Family: Eulimidae
- Genus: Hemiliostraca
- Species: H. diagues

Binomial name
- Hemiliostraca diagues Tomlin & Shackleford, 1915

Synonyms
- Leiostraca diagues Tomlin & Shackleford, 1915

Species of gastropod

Hemiliostraca diagues is a species of sea snail, a marine gastropod mollusk in the family Eulimidae.

== Distribution ==
This species occurs in the following locations:

- Angola
- Cape Verde
- Gulf of Guinea
