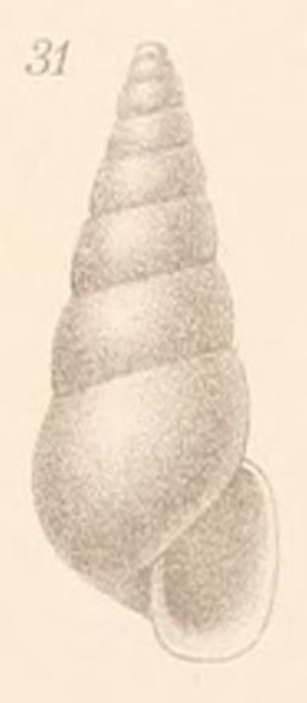
- Bathycrinicola tumidula shell

Scientific classification
- Kingdom: Animalia
- Phylum: Mollusca
- Class: Gastropoda
- Subclass: Caenogastropoda
- Order: Littorinimorpha
- Family: Eulimidae
- Genus: Bathycrinicola
- Species: B. tumidula

Binomial name
- Bathycrinicola tumidula (Thiele, 1912)

Synonyms
- Eulima tumidula Thiele, 1912; Melanella tumidula (Thiele, 1912)

= Bathycrinicola tumidula =

Species of gastropod

Bathycrinicola tumidula is a species of sea snail, a marine gastropod mollusc in the family Eulimidae.

== Distribution ==
This species is distributed within Antarctica waters, these include the Weddell Sea, Ross Sea and Amundsen Sea. Bathycrinicola tumidula is also notable for inhabiting McMurdo Sound, near McMurdo Station, Ross Island here, scientists who inhabit the American station throughout the summer months can observe this species carefully.
