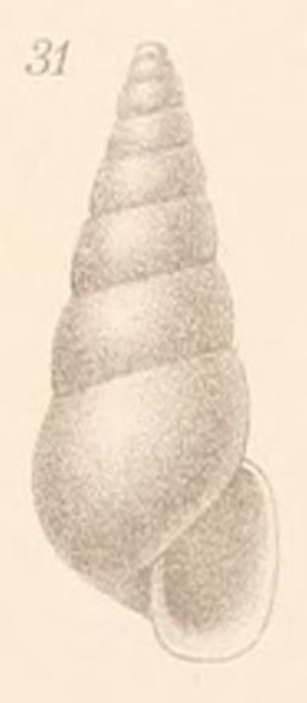
- Bathycrinicola tumidula shell

Scientific classification
- Kingdom: Animalia
- Phylum: Mollusca
- Class: Gastropoda
- Subclass: Caenogastropoda
- Order: Littorinimorpha
- Superfamily: Vanikoroidea
- Family: Eulimidae
- Genus: Bathycrinicola; Bouchet & Warén, 1986

Type species
- Eulima talaena Dautzenberg & Fischer H., 1897

= Bathycrinicola =

Genus of gastropods

Bathycrinicola is a genus of medium-sized sea snails, marine gastropod molluscs in the family Eulimidae.

== Species ==
Species within this genus include:

- Bathycrinicola curta (Warén, 1972)
- Bathycrinicola fernandinae (Dall, 1927)
- Bathycrinicola macrapex Bouchet & Warén, 1986
- Bathycrinicola media Bouchet & Warén, 1986
- Bathycrinicola micrapex Bouchet & Warén, 1986
- Bathycrinicola nacraensis Peñas & Giribet, 2003
- Bathycrinicola talaena (Dautzenberg & Fischer H., 1897)
- Bathycrinicola tumidula (Thiele, 1912)
