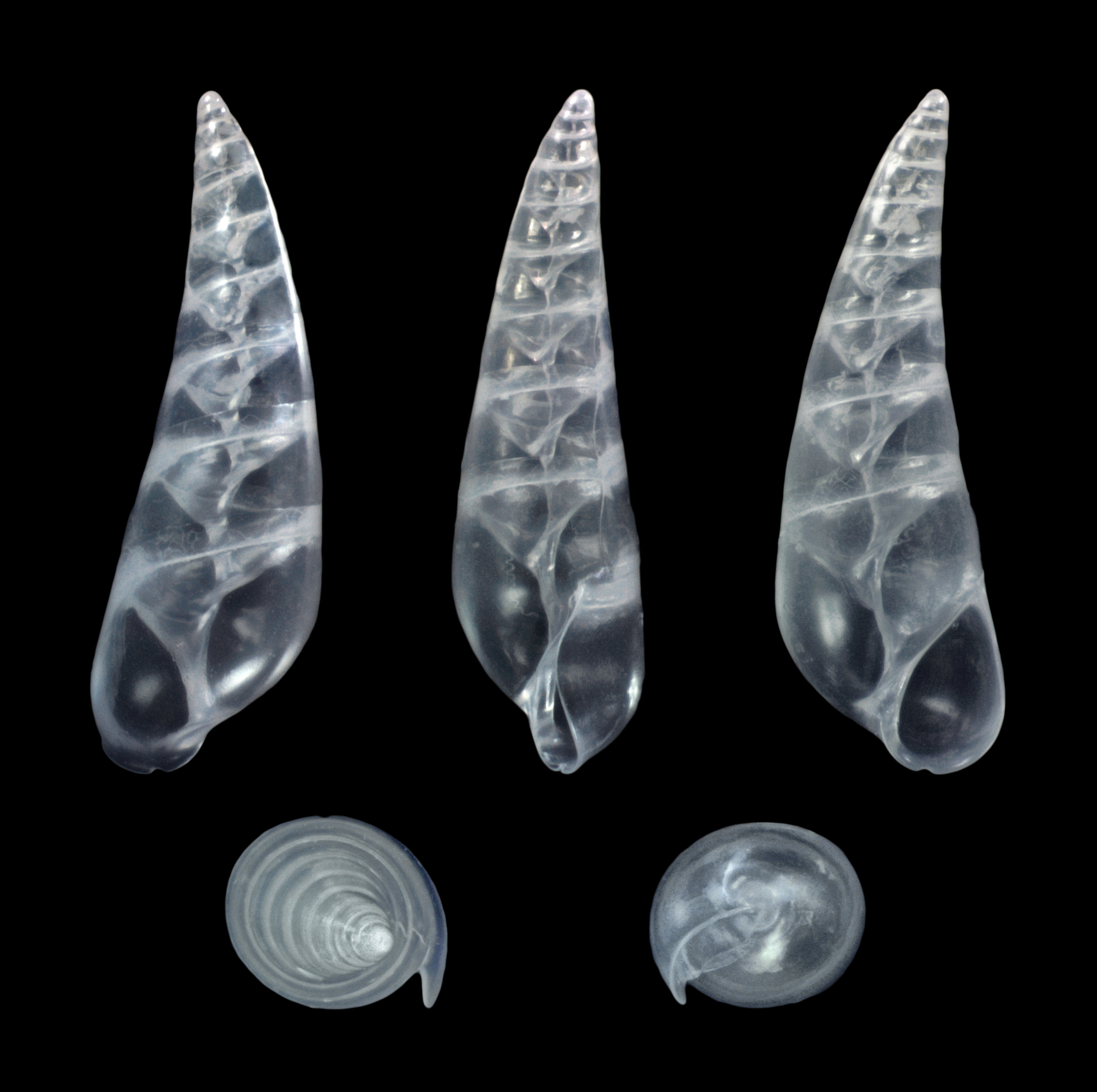

Scientific classification
- Kingdom: Animalia
- Phylum: Mollusca
- Class: Gastropoda
- Subclass: Caenogastropoda
- Order: Littorinimorpha
- Family: Eulimidae
- Genus: Vitreolina
- Species: V. philippi

Binomial name
- Vitreolina philippi (de Rayneval & Ponzi, 1854)

Synonyms
- Eulima franquiae Oberling, 1970; Eulima philippi de Rayneval & Ponzi, 1854; Eulima rhaphium Watson, 1897; Vitreolina philippii (Rayneval & Ponzi, 1854) (spelling variation)

= Vitreolina philippi =

Species of gastropod

Vitreolina philippi is a species of sea snail, a marine gastropod mollusk in the family Eulimidae. The species is one of a number within the genus Vitreolina.

== Distribution ==
This species occurs in the Mediterranean Sea, in the North Atlantic Ocean (in European waters) and off the Azores, Canary Islands and Cape Verde.
