= Hemiliostraca samoensis =

Scientific classification
- Kingdom: Animalia
- Phylum: Mollusca
- Class: Gastropoda
- Subclass: Caenogastropoda
- Order: Littorinimorpha
- Family: Eulimidae
- Genus: Hemiliostraca
- Species: H. samoensis

Binomial name
- Hemiliostraca samoensis Crosse, 1867

Synonyms
- Leiostraca samoensis Crosse, 1867

Species of gastropod

Hemiliostraca samoensis is a species of sea snail, a marine gastropod mollusk in the family Eulimidae.
