= Vitreolina conica =

- Shell of Vitreolina conica

Scientific classification
- Kingdom: Animalia
- Phylum: Mollusca
- Class: Gastropoda
- Subclass: Caenogastropoda
- Order: Littorinimorpha
- Family: Eulimidae
- Genus: Vitreolina
- Species: V. conica

Binomial name
- Vitreolina conica (C. B. Adams, 1850)

Synonyms
- Eulima conica C. B. Adams, 1850; Melanella conica (C. B. Adams, 1850); Rissoina conica (C. B. Adams, 1850)

Species of gastropod

Vitreolina conica is a species of sea snail, a marine gastropod mollusk in the family Eulimidae. The species is one of a number within the genus Vitreolina.

== Distribution ==
This species occurs in the Caribbean Sea and in the Gulf of Mexico.

== Description ==
(Original description) The shell is conic and turrited. It is white and smooth and shining. The apex is acute. The spire has its axis moderately curved throughout, with the outlines rectilinear in the plane perpendicular to that of the curvature. The about eleven whorls are planulate, and have an indistinct suture. The body whorl is subangular and quite oblique anteriorly. The aperture is small and ovate. The mean divergence is about 22°; the length is 0.1 inch, and the diameter is 0.042 inch.
