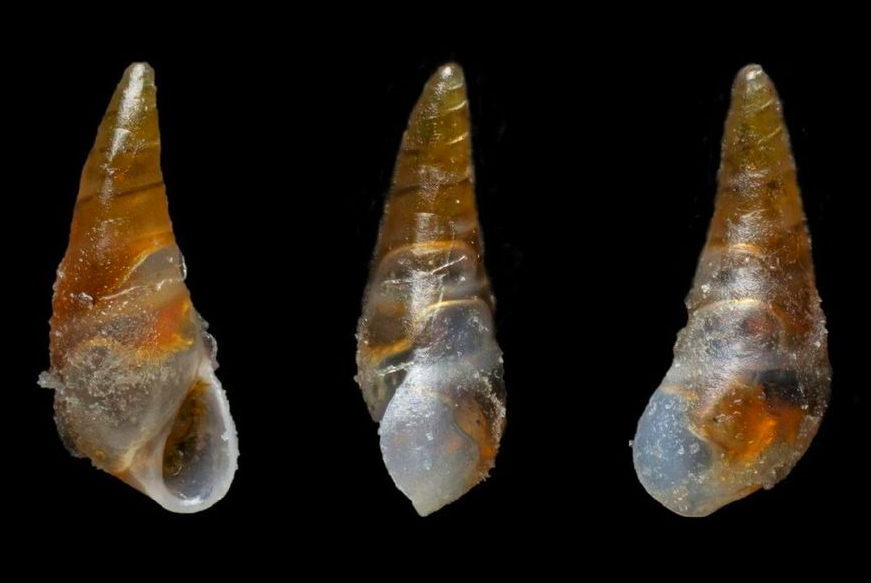
- Shell of Vitreolina yod (syntype at the Natural History Museum, London)

Scientific classification
- Kingdom: Animalia
- Phylum: Mollusca
- Class: Gastropoda
- Subclass: Caenogastropoda
- Order: Littorinimorpha
- Family: Eulimidae
- Genus: Vitreolina
- Species: V. yod

Binomial name
- Vitreolina yod (P. P. Carpenter, 1857)

Synonyms
- Leiostraca distorta var. yod P. P. Carpenter, 1857 superseded rank; Melanella (Balcis) taravali Bartsch, 1917 junior subjective synonym

= Vitreolina yod =

Species of gastropod

Vitreolina yod is a species of sea snail, a marine gastropod mollusk in the family Eulimidae.

== Description ==
The length of the shell attains 1.2 mm, its diameter 0.3 mm.

(Original description) The shell is very minute and bluish-white, and it is doubly flexed, with the anterior portion turned to the right and the tip flexed backward.

The shell contains nine whorls. The first three whorls are well rounded and are separated by a well-impressed suture, while the rest are almost flat, separated by an inconspicuous suture and marked only by exceedingly fine incremental lines. The body whorl is inflated, with its periphery well rounded. The base is short and well rounded.

The aperture is broadly oval, with its posterior angle acute. The outer lip is thin and slightly protracted in the middle, while the inner lip is short and slightly curved, reflected over and appressed to the base. The parietal wall is covered by a rather thick callus.

== Distribution ==
This species occurs in the Pacific Ocean off California (USA) and Mexico.
