= Melanella levantina =

Scientific classification
- Kingdom: Animalia
- Phylum: Mollusca
- Class: Gastropoda
- Subclass: Caenogastropoda
- Order: Littorinimorpha
- Family: Eulimidae
- Genus: Melanella
- Species: M. levantina

Binomial name
- Melanella levantina (Oliverio, Buzzurro & R. Villa, 1994)

Synonyms
- Vitreolina levantina Oliverio, Buzzurro & R. Villa, 1994 (original combination)

Species of gastropod

Melanella levantina is a species of sea snail, a marine gastropod mollusk in the family Eulimidae.

== Description ==
The length of the shell varies between 3 mm and 4 mm.

== Distribution ==
This marine species occurs in the Eastern Mediterranean Sea.
