= Melanella boscii =

Scientific classification
- Kingdom: Animalia
- Phylum: Mollusca
- Class: Gastropoda
- Subclass: Caenogastropoda
- Order: Littorinimorpha
- Family: Eulimidae
- Genus: Melanella
- Species: M. boscii

Binomial name
- Melanella boscii (Payraudeau, 1826)

Synonyms
- Eulima brevis Requien, 1848; Melanella brevis (Requien, 1848); Rissoa boscii Payraudeau, 1826

Species of gastropod

Melanella boscii is a species of sea snail, a marine gastropod mollusk in the family Eulimidae.
