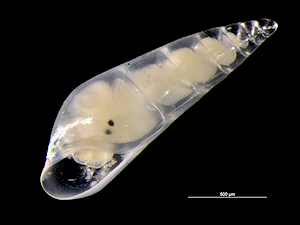

Scientific classification
- Kingdom: Animalia
- Phylum: Mollusca
- Class: Gastropoda
- Subclass: Caenogastropoda
- Order: Littorinimorpha
- Family: Eulimidae
- Genus: Vitreolina
- Species: V. antiflexa

Binomial name
- Vitreolina antiflexa (Monterosato, 1884)

Synonyms
- Eulima (Vitreolina) antiflexa Monterosato, 1884; Eulima anteflexa Locard, 1892; Eulima antiflexa Monterosato, 1884; Eulima distorta var. exilis Monterosato, 1884; Melanella anteflexa (unjustidfied emendation by Locard, 1892)

= Vitreolina antiflexa =

Species of gastropod

Vitreolina antiflexa is a species of sea snail, a marine gastropod mollusk in the family Eulimidae. The species is one of a number within the genus Eulima.

== Distribution ==
This species occurs ion the North Atlantic Ocean and in the Mediterranean Sea off Greece.
