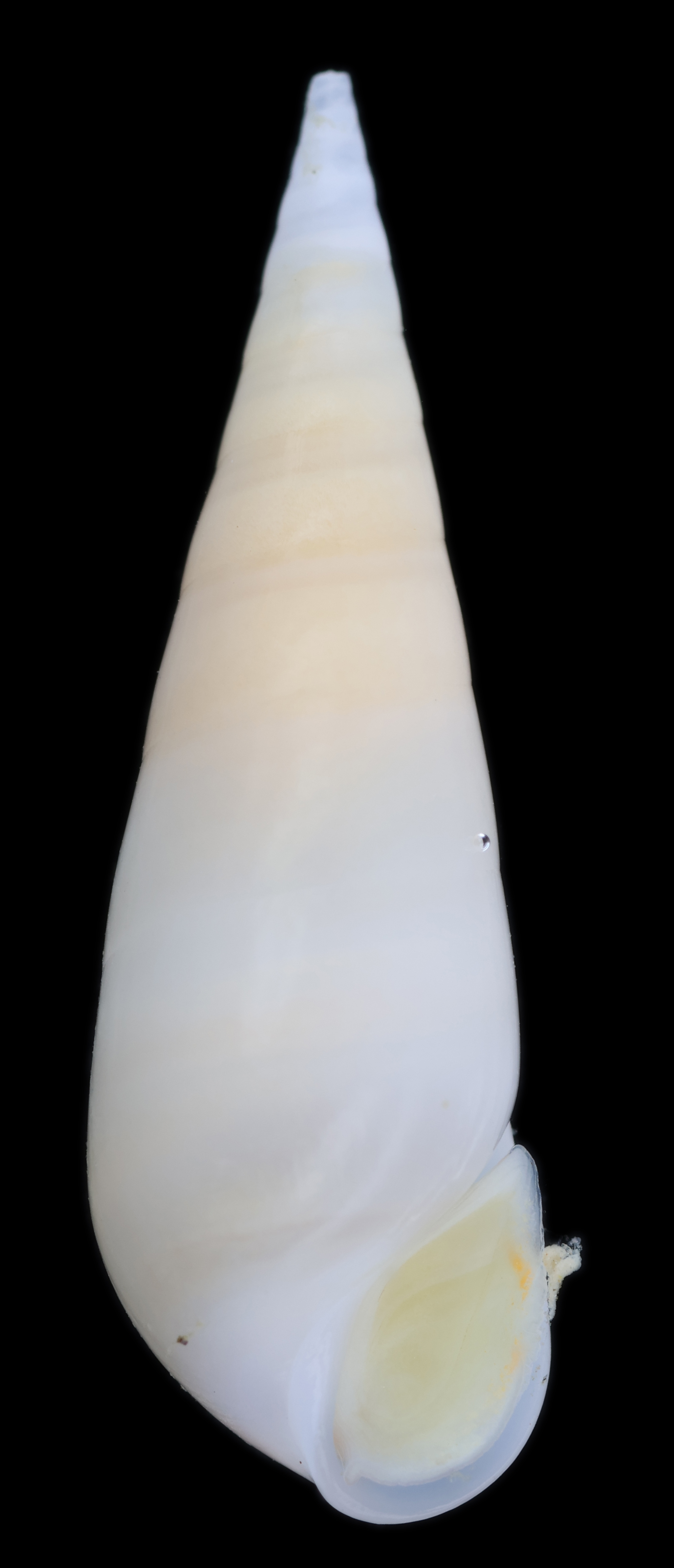
- Shell of Melanella alba (Preserved specimen at MNHN, Paris)

Scientific classification
- Kingdom: Animalia
- Phylum: Mollusca
- Class: Gastropoda
- Subclass: Caenogastropoda
- Order: Littorinimorpha
- Family: Eulimidae
- Genus: Melanella
- Species: M. alba

Binomial name
- Melanella alba da Costa, 1778

Synonyms
- Balcis Alba da Costa, 1778; Balcis montagui Leach MS, Gray, 1847; Eulima alba Da Costa, 1778; Eulima anglica G.B. Sowerby I, 1834; Eulima gervillei Collard des Cherres, 1830; Eulima porcellana A. Adams, 1851; Eulima subangulata G.B. Sowerby I, 1834; Melanella anglica Sowerby, 1834; Melanella laevis Pennant, 1777; Melanella montagui Leach MS, Gray, 1847; Melanella porcellana A. Adams, 1851; Melanella subangulata Sowerby, 1834; Melania gervillei Collard des Cherres, 1830; Strombiformis albus Da Costa, 1778

= Melanella alba =

Species of gastropod

Melanella alba is a species of sea snail, a marine gastropod mollusk in the family Eulimidae. The species is one of many species known to exist within the genus Melanella.

== Description ==
The measured length of a typical shell of this species generally ranges from approximately 10 mm to as large as 19 mm.

(Described in Latin as Eulima porcellana) The solid shell is subulate, white, and opaque. It has a slightly flexuous apex. It consists of thirteen to fourteen flattened whorls, which bear irregular, impressed lateral varices. The aperture is oblong-ovate. The anterior portion of the inner lip is thickened with callus and is scarcely reflected, while the margin of the outer lip is expanded in the middle.

== Distribution ==
This species occurs in the following locations at infralittoral and circalittoral levels:

- Belgian Exclusive Economic Zone
- British Isles
- European waters (ERMS scope)
- Irish Exclusive Economic Zone
- Mediterranean Sea
- North East Atlantic
- Norwegian Exclusive Economic Zone
- Portuguese Exclusive Economic Zone
- Spanish Exclusive Economic Zone
- Swedish Exclusive Economic Zone
- United Kingdom Exclusive Economic Zone
- Wimereux
