= Melanella laevigata =

- Shell of Melanella laevigata

Scientific classification
- Kingdom: Animalia
- Phylum: Mollusca
- Class: Gastropoda
- Subclass: Caenogastropoda
- Order: Littorinimorpha
- Family: Eulimidae
- Genus: Melanella
- Species: †M. laevigata

Binomial name
- †Melanella laevigata (H. C. Lea, 1843)

Synonyms
- † Eulima eborea Conrad, 1846 junior subjective synonym; † Eulima laevigata (H. C. Lea, 1843) superseded combination; † Melanella (Melanella) bartschi J. A. Gardner & Aldrich, 1919 junior subjective synonym; † Melanella bartschi J. A. Gardner & Aldrich, 1919 junior subjective synonym; † Melanella eborea (Conrad, 1846) junior subjective synonym; † Pasithea laevigata H. C. Lea, 1843 superseded combination; † Strombiformis (Polygireulima) eborea (Conrad, 1846) junior subjective synonym; † Strombiformis bartschi (J. A. Gardner & Aldrich, 1919) junior subjective synonym

Species of gastropod

Melanella laevigata is an extinct species of sea snail, a marine gastropod mollusk in the family Eulimidae. The species is one of a number within the genus Melanella.

== Description ==
The height of the shell attains 16 mm, and its diameter is 4.2 mm

(Described as Melanella bartschi") The shell is imperforate, straight, and quite large for the genus, featuring an elongate-conic outline. The spire is subulate, with the body whorl making up a little more than one-third of the total altitude of the entire shell. Its whorls are closely appressed, flattened, and regularly increase in size, numbering approximately 15 in total. The body whorl is evenly rounded in adults, whereas it is more or less obtusely angulated in young and adolescent specimens. The suture remains distinct but inconspicuous.

The protoconch is broken in all available material.

The external surface is smooth and polished. The aperture is holostomous (without a notch or siphonal canal), obliquely sub-ovate, moderately wide, and acutely angulated posteriorly. The peristome is not continuous. The outer lip is arcuate, feebly contracted directly in front of the posterior suture, expanding again away from the suture, and becoming slightly patulous anteriorly. The columella is quite strongly concave at the base of the body. The inner lip is reflexed and fused with the heavy parietal wash.

== Distribution ==
Fossils of this marine species were found in Virginia and in Upper Miocene strata in South Carolina, USA.
