= Vitreolina arcuata =

Scientific classification
- Kingdom: Animalia
- Phylum: Mollusca
- Class: Gastropoda
- Subclass: Caenogastropoda
- Order: Littorinimorpha
- Family: Eulimidae
- Genus: Vitreolina
- Species: V. arcuata

Binomial name
- Vitreolina arcuata (C. B. Adams, 1850)

Synonyms
- Eulima arcuata C. B. Adams, 1850; Melanella arcuata (C. B. Adams, 1850)

Species of gastropod

Vitreolina arcuata is a species of sea snail, a marine gastropod mollusk in the family Eulimidae. The species is one of a number within the genus Vitreolina.

== Distribution ==
This species occurs in the Caribbean Sea and in the Gulf of Mexico.

== Description ==
The maximum recorded shell length is 4.2 mm.

== Habitat ==
Minimum recorded depth is 0 m. Maximum recorded depth is 166 m.
