= Melanella solitaria =

- Shell of Melanella solitaria (original image)

Scientific classification
- Kingdom: Animalia
- Phylum: Mollusca
- Class: Gastropoda
- Subclass: Caenogastropoda
- Order: Littorinimorpha
- Family: Eulimidae
- Genus: Melanella
- Species: M. solitaria

Binomial name
- Melanella solitaria (E. A. Smith, 1915)

Synonyms
- Balcis solitaria (E. A. Smith, 1915); Eulima solitaria E. A. Smith, 1915 unaccepted > junior homonym (invalid; not C. B. Adams, 1852); Melanella laseroni Hedley, 1916 (superseded combination)

Species of gastropod

Melanella solitaria, is a species of sea snail, a marine gastropod mollusk in the family Eulimidae. The species is one of a number within the genus Melanella.

== Description ==
The length of the shell attains 4 mm, its diameter 1.5 mm.

(Original description) The small shell is white, shining, and somewhat curved. It consists of seven slightly convex whorls, which increase gradually and are separated by an almost horizontal suture that is very narrowly hyaline-margined beneath. The spire is slightly arcuate, with an oblique and obtuse apex. The aperture is inversely ear-shaped (auriform) and measures about one-third the total length of the shell. The columella is nearly straight and is united above to the outer lip by a thin callus.

== Distribution ==
This marine species was originally found off McMurdo Sound , Antarctica.
