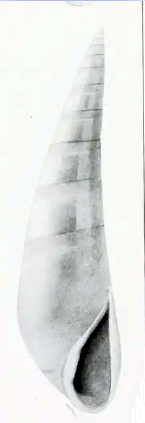
- Shell of Vitreolina macra (original image)

Scientific classification
- Kingdom: Animalia
- Phylum: Mollusca
- Class: Gastropoda
- Subclass: Caenogastropoda
- Order: Littorinimorpha
- Family: Eulimidae
- Genus: Vitreolina
- Species: V. macra

Binomial name
- Vitreolina macra Bartsch, 1917

Synonyms
- † Balcis (Vitreolina) obstipa S. S. Berry, 1954 nomen nudum; Melanella (Balcis) macra Bartsch, 1917 unaccepted (basionym); † Melanella (Balcis) prefalcata Bartsch, 1917; Melanella macra Bartsch, 1917

= Vitreolina macra =

Species of gastropod

Vitreolina macra is a species of sea snail, a marine gastropod mollusk in the family Eulimidae.

== Description ==
The length of the shell attains 7.5 mm, its diameter 1.9 mm.

(Original description) The shell is of medium size and slender, with a double flexure. When it is viewed with the aperture to the front, it shows the early whorls bent backward and the succeeding turns flexed to the right. The shell is bluish-white, except where the dried animal shines through its substance; there it has a granular, light brown to buff appearance.

The shell contains 13 whorls. The first four whorls are well rounded, with a well-impressed suture, while the remainder are almost flattened, marked only by exceedingly fine lines of growth and separated by a scarcely visible suture. The posterior limit of the inside of the whorls shines through the substance of the shell and appears as a conspicuous false suture. The periphery of the body whorl is weakly angulated, and the base is somewhat prolonged and well rounded.

The aperture is long and ovate, with its posterior angle acute. The outer lip is considerably protracted, particularly so at the periphery, while the inner lip is stout and curved, reflected over and appressed to the base. The parietal wall is covered by a thick callus.

== Distribution ==
This species occurs in the Pacific Ocean off California (USA), Mexico and Costa Rica.
