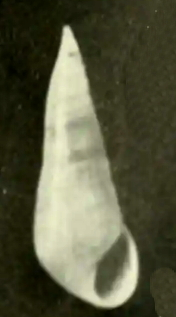
- Shell of Melanella kahoolawensis (holotype)

Scientific classification
- Kingdom: Animalia
- Phylum: Mollusca
- Class: Gastropoda
- Subclass: Caenogastropoda
- Order: Littorinimorpha
- Family: Eulimidae
- Genus: Melanella
- Species: M. kahoolawensis

Binomial name
- Melanella kahoolawensis Pilsbry, 1917

Synonyms
- Balcis aciculata (Pease, 1861) (secondary homonym of Melanella aciculata (I. Lea, 1833)); Eulima aciculata Pease, 1861 (secondary homonym of Melanella aciculata (I. Lea, 1833) ); Eulimaustra anomala Laseron, 1955 junior subjective synonym; Melanella aciculata (Pease, 1861) (secondary homonym of Melanella aciculata (I. Lea, 1833) ); Melanella anomala (Laseron, 1955); Melanella helena Thiele, 1930 junior subjective synonym

= Melanella kahoolawensis =

Species of gastropod

Melanella kahoolawensis is a species of sea snail, a marine gastropod mollusk in the family Eulimidae. The species is one of multiple species known to exist within the genus, Melanella.

== Description ==
The length of the shell attains 9.4 mm, its diameter 3.25 mm.

(Original description) The shell is irregularly but slightly curved, acuminate near the apex, solid, and whitish.

The shell contains about 12 whorls. The whorls are nearly flat, the suture is not impressed, and it is bordered below by a rather wide grayish-white band. On the penultimate whorl there is one varix near the left side, while the two preceding whorls each have a varix on the right side. The aperture is ovate; the outer lip is blunt and strongly retracted above. The columella is vertical and somewhat thick.

== Distribution ==
This marine species occurs off Hawaii.
