= Melanella petitiana =

- Shell of Melanella petitiana (specimen at the Natural History Museum, Rotterdam)

Scientific classification
- Kingdom: Animalia
- Phylum: Mollusca
- Class: Gastropoda
- Subclass: Caenogastropoda
- Order: Littorinimorpha
- Family: Eulimidae
- Genus: Melanella
- Species: M. petitiana

Binomial name
- Melanella petitiana (Brusina, 1869)

Synonyms
- Eulima petitiana Brusina, 1869; Vitreolina petitiana (Brusina, 1869)

Species of gastropod

Melanella petitiana is a species of sea snail, a marine gastropod mollusk in the family Eulimidae.

== Description ==
The length of the shell attains 3 1/2 mm, its diameter 1 2/3 mm.

(Original description in Latin) The solid shell is ovate-conical and somewhat pointe. It is ivory-white, and very glossy. It has seven nearly flat, contiguous whorls, with the sutures scarcely distinct. The aperture is small, oval, pointed at the upper end, and measures approximately one quarter of the total shell length. The outer lip is rather blunt and straight.

== Distribution ==
This marine species occurs in the Croatian part of the Adriatic Sea.
