= Melanella obtusoapicata =

- Shell of Melanella obtusoapicata (specimen at the Natural History Museum, London)

Scientific classification
- Kingdom: Animalia
- Phylum: Mollusca
- Class: Gastropoda
- Subclass: Caenogastropoda
- Order: Littorinimorpha
- Family: Eulimidae
- Genus: Melanella
- Species: M. obtusoapicata

Binomial name
- Melanella obtusoapicata Bouchet & Warén, 1986

Synonyms
- Eulima obtusa Jeffreys, 1884 ·(preoccupied by Eulima obtusa de Folin, 1870; Melanella obtusoapicata is a replacement name); Melanella obtusa (Jeffreys, 1884) ·

Species of gastropod

Melanella obtusoapicata is a species of sea snail, a marine gastropod mollusk in the family Eulimidae.

== Description ==
The length of the shell attains 4 mm

== Distribution ==
This abyssal marine species occurs in the Atlantic Ocean off Portugal and northern Spain.
