= Melanella eburnea =

- Shell of Melanella eburnea

Scientific classification
- Kingdom: Animalia
- Phylum: Mollusca
- Class: Gastropoda
- Subclass: Caenogastropoda
- Order: Littorinimorpha
- Family: Eulimidae
- Genus: Melanella
- Species: M. eburnea

Binomial name
- Melanella eburnea (Mühlfeld, 1824)

Synonyms
- Eulima jamaicensis (C. B. Adams, 1845); Helix eburnea Mühlfeld, 1824; Melanella jamaicensis (C. B. Adams, 1845)

Species of gastropod

Melanella eburnea is a species of sea snail, a marine gastropod mollusk in the family Eulimidae. The species is one of a number within the genus Melanella.

== Description ==
(Described as Eulima japaicensis) The shell is slender, milky-white, and translucent, encircled by an opaque white sutural band. The suture is linear and moderately deep. There are 13 whorls, which are flat and smooth. The aperture is very small, and the outer lip is expanded.

== Distribution ==
This species occurs in the following locations:

- in the Caribbean Sea
- in the Atlantic Ocean from New Jersey, USA to São Paulo, Brazil
