= Melanella odontoidea =

Scientific classification
- Kingdom: Animalia
- Phylum: Mollusca
- Class: Gastropoda
- Subclass: Caenogastropoda
- Order: Littorinimorpha
- Family: Eulimidae
- Genus: Melanella
- Species: M. odontoidea

Binomial name
- Melanella odontoidea (A. Adams, 1861)

Synonyms
- Balcis kyurokusinensis Nomura & Hatai, 1940; Eulima odontoidea A. Adams, 1861; Melanella kyurokusinensis (Nomura & Hatai, 1940)

Species of gastropod

Melanella odontoidea is a species of sea snail, a marine gastropod mollusk in the family Eulimidae. The species is one of many species known to exist within the genus, Melanella.

== Description ==
(Original description in Latin) The shell is awl-shaped and slightly flexuous, with a slender, tapering spire. It consists of ten flattened whorls, the last of which is broad and rounded. The aperture is oval, projecting and narrowing anteriorly. The outer lip is produced and arched, while the inner lip is short, thin, and curved. The shell is milky white and semi-opaque.

== Distribution ==
This species occurs in the Sea of Japan; also off South Africa.
