= Vitreolina aurata =

Scientific classification
- Kingdom: Animalia
- Phylum: Mollusca
- Class: Gastropoda
- Subclass: Caenogastropoda
- Order: Littorinimorpha
- Family: Eulimidae
- Genus: Vitreolina
- Species: V. aurata

Binomial name
- Vitreolina aurata (Hirase, 1920)

Synonyms
- Melanella aurata Hirase, 1920

Species of gastropod

Vitreolina aurata is a species of sea snail, a marine gastropod mollusk in the family Eulimidae.
