= Bathycrinicola fernandinae =

Scientific classification
- Kingdom: Animalia
- Phylum: Mollusca
- Class: Gastropoda
- Subclass: Caenogastropoda
- Order: Littorinimorpha
- Family: Eulimidae
- Genus: Bathycrinicola
- Species: B. fernandinae

Binomial name
- Bathycrinicola fernandinae Dall, 1927

Synonyms
- Melanella fernandinae Dall, 1927

Species of gastropod

Bathycrinicola fernandinae is a species of sea snail, a marine gastropod mollusc in the family Eulimidae.

== Distribution ==
This marine species occurs off the coasts of Florida in the southeast United States.
