= Hypermastus randolphi =

- Shell of Hypermastus randolphi

Scientific classification
- Kingdom: Animalia
- Phylum: Mollusca
- Class: Gastropoda
- Subclass: Caenogastropoda
- Order: Littorinimorpha
- Family: Eulimidae
- Genus: Hypermastus
- Species: H. randolphi

Binomial name
- Hypermastus randolphi Vanatta, 1900

Synonyms
- Balcis randolphi (Vanatta, 1900) superseded combination; Eulima californica Bartsch, 1917; Eulima randolphi Vanatta, 1900; Melanella californica Bartsch, 1917; Melanella randolphi Vanatta, 1900; Strombiformis californica Bartsch, 1917

Species of gastropod

Hypermastus randolphi is a species of sea snail, a marine gastropod mollusk in the family Eulimidae. Bartsch and Vanatta are the major contributors to the taxonomic synonymy of this species of Caenogastropoda.

== Description ==
The length of the shell attains 6 mm, its maximum diameter 2.3 mm, the length of the aperture 2.1 mm, breadth 1,1 mm, diameter of the apex3 mm.

(Original description) The smooth shell is rather slender and shining. It is bluish white when empty, but when the animal is dried in, the spire is orange colored above, pink in the middle with sometimes a slight yellowish band on the body whorl, opaque. The outlines of the spire are straight and conical. The protoconch is blunt, rounded, of moderate size. The suture is impressed. There are no varices.

The shell consists of seven or eight whorls. The body whorl is ovate, the whorls of the spire are a little convex. The aperture is ovate. The outer lipis sloping to the right, nearly straight; in profile it is moderately arched forward below and sometimes retracted very slightly above. The columella is slender, concave below, convex above, forming an angle with the convex parietal wall. The parietal callus is very thin.

== Distribution ==
This marine species occurs off Alaska.
