= Melanella teinostoma =

- Shell of Melanella teinostoma (specimen at the Natural History Museum, Rotterdam)

Scientific classification
- Kingdom: Animalia
- Phylum: Mollusca
- Class: Gastropoda
- Subclass: Caenogastropoda
- Order: Littorinimorpha
- Family: Eulimidae
- Genus: Melanella
- Species: M. teinostoma

Binomial name
- Melanella teinostoma (A. Adams, 1854)

Synonyms
- Eulima teinostoma A. Adams, 1854 superseded combination; Hypermastus teinostoma (A. Adams, 1853) superseded combination; Melanella gigas (Kuroda & Habe, 1950) · unaccepted; Mucronalia gigas Kuroda & Habe, 1950

Species of gastropod

Melanella teinostoma is a species of sea snail, a marine gastropod mollusk in the family Eulimidae. The species is one of many species known to exist within the genus, Melanella.

== Description ==
(Original description in Latin) The shell is subulate-turreted and straight. it is whitish, shiny and somewhat translucent. It contains 12 flattened whorls, with an impressed line below the sutures; with the body whorl rounded. The aperture is oblong-oval and produced anteriorly. The inner lip is nearly straight and reflected anteriorly; the outer lip margin is dilated in the middle.

== Distribution ==
The holotype of this species was found off the Fiji Islands; it also occurs off Japan, Indonesia, Micronesia, Hawaii, New Caledonia and Papua New Guinea.
