= Melanella olssoni =

- Shell of Melanella olssoni (holotype in the Smithsonian Institution)

Scientific classification
- Kingdom: Animalia
- Phylum: Mollusca
- Class: Gastropoda
- Subclass: Caenogastropoda
- Order: Littorinimorpha
- Family: Eulimidae
- Genus: Melanella
- Species: M. olssoni

Binomial name
- Melanella olssoni (Bartsch, 1924)

Synonyms
- Melanella (Balcis) capa Bartsch, 1926 junior subjective synonym; Melanella (Melanella) olssoni Bartsch, 1924 alternative representation; Melanella capa (Bartsch, 1926) junior subjective synonym

Species of gastropod

Melanella olssoni is a species of sea snail, a marine gastropod mollusk in the family Eulimidae. The species is one of a number within the genus Melanella.

== Description ==
The length of the shell attains 4.5 mm, its diameter 1.2 mm

(Original description) The shell is regularly elongate-conic. It is bluish-white and semitranslucent. The shell contains 8.5 whorls. The whorls of the protoconch are decollated. The postnuclear whorls are almost flattened, giving the spire an almost straight outline, and are appressed at the summit. The basal portion of the preceding whorl shines through the substance of the succeeding whorl at its summit, giving the latter the appearance of having a double suture. The periphery is strongly rounded. The base is rather long and well rounded.

The entire surface of the shell is smooth and has a silky luster. The aperture is oval. The posterior angle is acute. The outer lip is slightly contracted near the summit and rather protracted in the middle, but is scarcely produced into a claw-like element; it is thin. The inner lip is stout, reflected over and appressed to the base. The parietal wall is covered by a moderately thick callus.

[2]

== Distribution ==
This marine species occurs off Ecuador.
