= Melanella sarissa =

- Shell of Melanella sarissa (specimen at the Natural History Museum, London)

Scientific classification
- Kingdom: Animalia
- Phylum: Mollusca
- Class: Gastropoda
- Subclass: Caenogastropoda
- Order: Littorinimorpha
- Family: Eulimidae
- Genus: Melanella
- Species: M. sarissa

Binomial name
- Melanella sarissa (R. B. Watson, 1883)

Synonyms
- Eulima sarissa R. B. Watson, 1883; Melanella cinca Dall, 1927

Species of gastropod

Melanella sarissa is a species of sea snail, a marine gastropod mollusk in the family Eulimidae.

== Description ==
The maximum recorded shell length is 3.2 mm, length of aperture 0.8 mm; diameter 1 mm.

(Described as Melanella cinca)- The minute shell is polished, white, and acutely conical. It contains about eight very slightly convex whorls. The suture is obscure and glazed over. The sculpture consists of very faint incremental lines.

The base is evenly rounded and imperforate. The aperture is subovate and short, with thin, simple margins; the outer lip is prominently convexly arcuate.

== Distribution and habitat ==
This species occurs in the Atlantic Ocean off Brazil and the eastr coast of the USA.

Minimum recorded depth is 538 m. Maximum recorded depth is 538 m.
