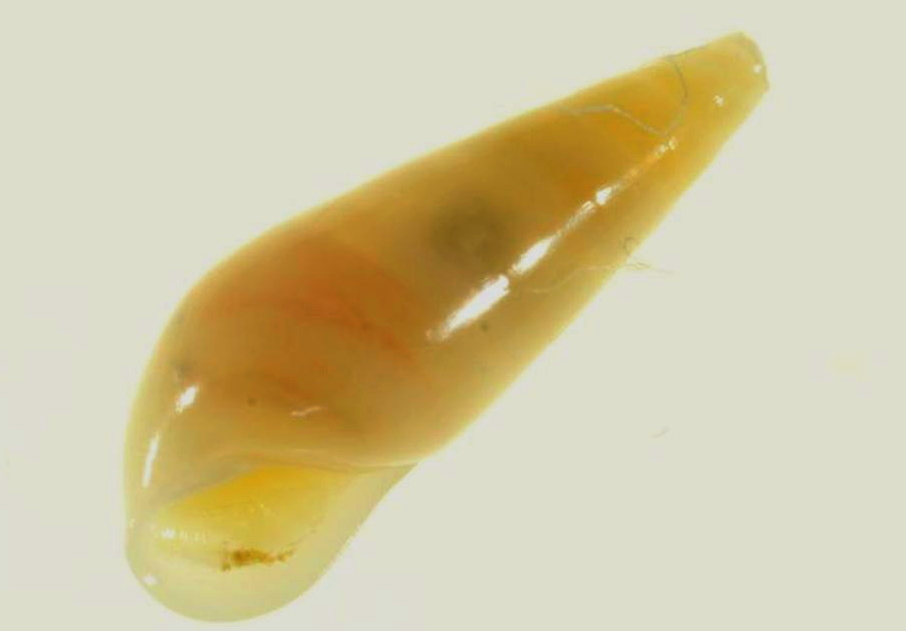
- Shell of Melanella thersites (specimen at the Centre for Biodiversity Genomics)

Scientific classification
- Kingdom: Animalia
- Phylum: Mollusca
- Class: Gastropoda
- Subclass: Caenogastropoda
- Order: Littorinimorpha
- Family: Eulimidae
- Genus: Melanella
- Species: M. thersites

Binomial name
- Melanella thersites (P. P. Carpenter, 1864)

Synonyms
- Balcis delmontensis A. G. Smith & M. Gordon, 1948; Eulima bistorta Vanatta, 1900; Eulima lowei Vanatta, 1900; Eulima thersites P. P. Carpenter, 1864; Melanella (Melanella) portlandica Bartsch, 1927 junior subjective synonym; Melanella delmontensis (A. G. Smith & M. Gordon, 1948); Melanella portlandica Bartsch, 1927 junior subjective synonym

= Melanella thersites =

Species of gastropod

Melanella thersites is a species of sea snail, a marine gastropod mollusk in the family Eulimidae. The species is one of many species known to exist within the genus, Melanella.

== Description ==
The length of the shell attains 6.3 mm, its diameter 2.3 mm.

The shell is broadly conic, rather stout and heavy, and polished and shining. It is usually flexed in one direction only, though sometimes in two. The 12 whorls are rather strongly rounded and are marked only by exceedingly fine incremental lines and by irregularly scattered varices. The sutures are strongly marked. The periphery of the body whorl is somewhat inflated and well rounded, while the base is short and well rounded.

The aperture is oval, with its posterior angle acute. The outer lip is thick within and sharp at the edge, and it is decidedly protracted a little anterior to the middle. The inner lip is stout and slightly curved, its posterior half being reflected over and appressed to the base. The parietal wall is covered by a very thick callus, which renders the peritreme complete.

== Distribution ==
This species occurs off the Pacific coast of Canada and the USA.
