= Melanella dufresnii =

- Shell of Melanella dufresnii

Scientific classification
- Kingdom: Animalia
- Phylum: Mollusca
- Class: Gastropoda
- Subclass: Caenogastropoda
- Order: Littorinimorpha
- Family: Eulimidae
- Genus: Melanella
- Species: M. dufresnii

Binomial name
- Melanella dufresnii Bowdich, 1822

Synonyms
- Eulima arcuata G. B. Sowerby II, 1865 (homonym of Eulima arcuata C. B. Adams, 1850); Eulima inflexa (Blainville, 1825); Melanella dufresnei [sic] · (misspelling); Melanella inflexa (Blainville, 1825); Melanella robillardiana Pilsbry, 1917; Phasianella inflexa Blainville, 1825 (junior subjective synonym)

Species of gastropod

Melanella dufresnii is a species of sea snail, a marine gastropod mollusk in the family Eulimidae.

== Description ==
(Original description) The shell of this marine species is semi-transparent and turreted, with a curved spire. The aperture is encroached upon by the body whorl. The color of the shell is white.

Because of the uncertainty of its true identity, the name Melanella dufresnii has been very little used, except as the name of the type species. It is the oldest available name for Eulima arcuata G.B. Sowerby, 1865 (non E. arcuata C. B. Adams, 1849, a Caribbean species of Melanella).

The species has been known, especially in Hawaii, as Eulima (or Balcis) thaanumi ^{Pilsbry, 1917}.

The taxonomy of the larger species of Melanella is very confused, and museum collections abound with misidentifications.

== Distribution ==
This abyssal marine species occurs in the Indo-West Pacific and off Australia (Queensland)
