= Melanella acanthyllis =

Scientific classification
- Kingdom: Animalia
- Phylum: Mollusca
- Class: Gastropoda
- Subclass: Caenogastropoda
- Order: Littorinimorpha
- Family: Eulimidae
- Genus: Melanella
- Species: M. acanthyllis

Binomial name
- Melanella acanthyllis (Watson, 1883)

Synonyms
- Balcis acanthyllis (R. B. Watson, 1883) superseded combination; Eulima acanthyllis R. B. Watson, 1883 superseded combination; Hemiliostraca acanthyllis (R. B. Watson, 1883) superseded combination

Species of gastropod

Melanella acanthyllis is a species of sea snail, a marine gastropod mollusk in the family Eulimidae. The species is one of a number within the genus Melanella.

== Description ==
The length of the shell attains 2.54 mm; its diameter 0.51 mm.

(Original description) The shell is very small and very slightly bent. It is transparent and has a very fine, somewhat oblique suture, flat-sided whorls, a straight oblique shortish base, a pear-shaped flat-ended aperture, and an excessively sharp tip. There is no sculpture. The colour is pure, very glossy, transparent white.

The apex is quite extraordinarily small and not perfectly regular; it is slightly pinched in at the very tip, which is rounded but slightly acuminated and not perfectly symmetrical. The spire is very high and narrow, nearly but not quite straight, one side being slightly more oblique than the other. There are eight whorls; they are almost perfectly flat-sided except towards the tip, where they are slightly rounded. The suture is rather oblique and scarcely impressed except towards the tip, where it is a little distinct; the septum between the whorls shines through the shell and thus makes the suture easily recognisable.

The aperture is pear-shaped but a little truncated in front. The outer lip is almost straight, arched at the outer basal corner, and a little straight in front; its edge is deeply sinuated above, prominent in the middle, and very retreating in front, where it forms a broad deep gutter. The inner lip is a thin, narrow glaze with a defined edge; it crosses the body and extends down the columella, on which it is expanded and slightly twisted. From the upper corner of the aperture to the point of the columella, the line is nearly straight or very slightly concave.

== Distribution ==
This marine species occurs off Hawaii.
