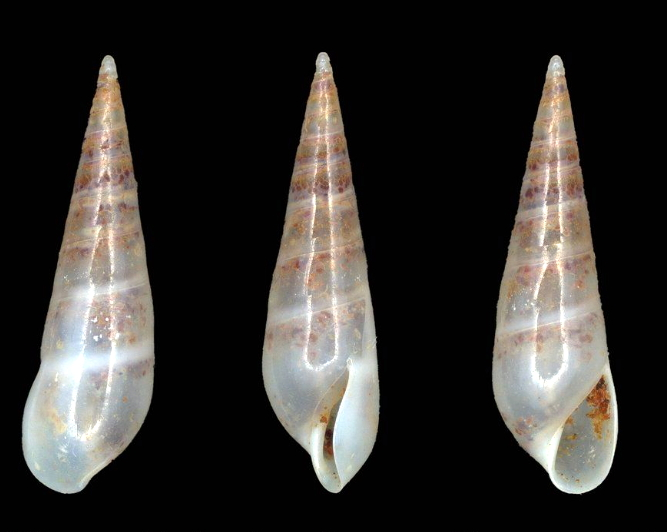
- Shell of Polygireulima rutila (specimen at the Denver Museum of Nature & Science)

Scientific classification
- Kingdom: Animalia
- Phylum: Mollusca
- Class: Gastropoda
- Subclass: Caenogastropoda
- Order: Littorinimorpha
- Family: Eulimidae
- Genus: Polygireulima
- Species: P. rutila

Binomial name
- Polygireulima rutila (P. P. Carpenter, 1865)

Synonyms
- Eulima rutila P. P. Carpenter, 1864 (original combination); Melanella (Melanella) rutila (P. P. Carpenter, 1864)

= Polygireulima rutila =

Species of gastropod

Polygireulima rutila is a species of sea snail, a marine gastropod mollusk in the family Eulimidae. The species is one of many species known to exist within the genus, Melanella.

== Description ==
The length of the shell attains 6.8 mm, its diameter 2.9 mm.

The shell is of medium size, elongate-conic, slender, and straight, with a polished, glassy surface that is devoid of any perceptible sculpture except for a series of irregularly distributed varices. The shell contains 13 whorls. The whorls are so strongly appressed at the summit that the suture is scarcely perceptible. The basal portion of each preceding whorl shines through the substance of the succeeding whorl, producing the appearance of a false suture. The true suture lies approximately one-third of the distance between the summit and the false suture, above the latter.

The periphery of the body whorl is rounded, while the base slopes in such a manner as to give the left outline a somewhat flattened appearance. The aperture is large and oval, with an acute posterior angle. The outer lip is distinctly protracted between the base and the posterior angle, forming a claw-like extension. The inner lip is short, moderately stout, and somewhat curved; it is reflected over and appressed to the base. The parietal wall is covered by a moderately thick callus.

== Distribution ==
This species occurs off the Pacific coast of North America and off Mexico and Panama.
