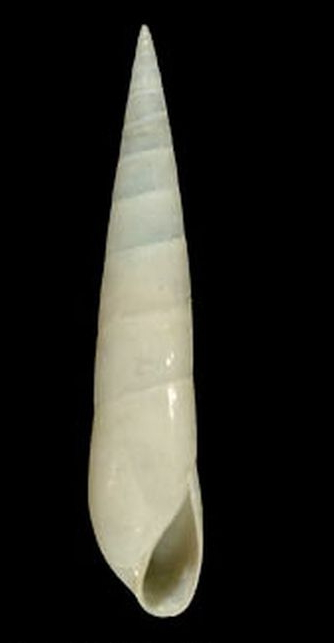
- Shell of Melanella attenuata (specimen at the Natural History Museum, Rotterdam)

Scientific classification
- Kingdom: Animalia
- Phylum: Mollusca
- Class: Gastropoda
- Subclass: Caenogastropoda
- Order: Littorinimorpha
- Family: Eulimidae
- Genus: Melanella
- Species: M. attenuata

Binomial name
- Melanella attenuata (G.B. Sowerby II, 1866)

Synonyms
- Eulima attenuata G.B. Sowerby II, 1866; Eulima rossinsulae Preston, 1916; Melanella rossinsulae Preston, 1916; Subularia montebelloensis Iredale, 1914

= Melanella attenuata =

Species of gastropod

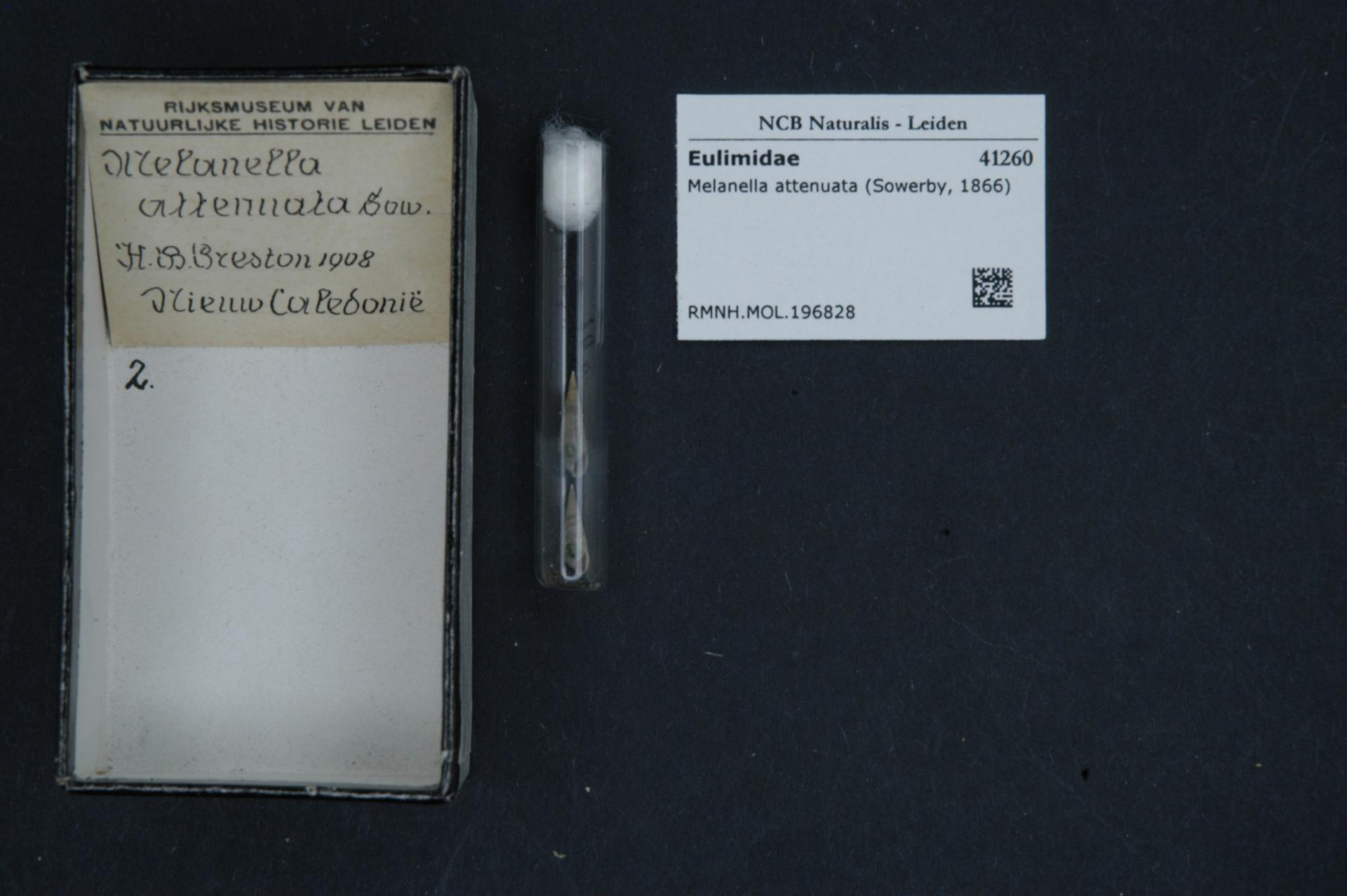
Melanella attenuata (Sowerby, 1866)

Melanella attenuata is a species of sea snail, a marine gastropod mollusk in the family Eulimidae. The species is one of many species known to exist within the genus, Melanella.

== Description ==
The length of the shell attains 11 mm, its diameter 2.25 mm.

(Described as Melanella rossinsulae) The shell is elongately subulate, semi‑opaque, and white. It has 17 whorls, which are flattened, not convex, smooth, polished, and shining. The suture is linear. The columellar margin is oblique. The outer lip (labrum) is acute and slightly bent inwards over the aperture. The aperture is slightly oblique and narrowly, somewhat elongately triangular in outline.

== Distribution ==
This species occurs off the following locations:

- Andaman Islands
- Madagascar
- Western Australia
