= Melanella cumingii =

- Shell of Melanella cumingii

Scientific classification
- Kingdom: Animalia
- Phylum: Mollusca
- Class: Gastropoda
- Subclass: Caenogastropoda
- Order: Littorinimorpha
- Family: Eulimidae
- Genus: Melanella
- Species: M. cumingii

Binomial name
- Melanella cumingii (A. Adams, 1854)

Synonyms
- Balcis cumingii (A. Adams, 1854) superseded combination; Eulima cumingii A. Adams, 1854 (original combination); Eulima picta G. B. Sowerby II, 1866; Melanella cumingii medipacifica Pilsbry, 1917; Melanella medipacifica Pilsbry, 1917; Melanella picta (G. B. Sowerby II, 1866) ·

Species of gastropod

Melanella cumingii is a species of sea snail, a marine gastropod mollusk in the family Eulimidae. The species is one of many species known to exist within the genus, Melanella.

== Description ==
The length of the shell attains 24 mm, irs diameter 7.5 mm.

(Original description in Latin) The shell is subulate-turreted, white, straight, solid, and opaque. It has 13 whorls, which are somewhat convex and furnished with irregular, impressed varices. The body whorl is rounded. The aperture is oblong-oval; the lip is callous and thickened anteriorly; the outer lip has a straight margin.

== Distribution ==
This species has a wide distribution in the Indo-Pacific; it also occurs off Taiwan, Japan and Australia (Western Australia)
