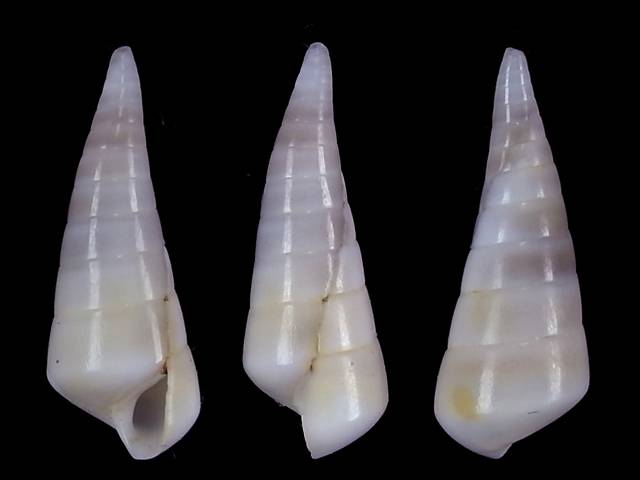
- Shell of Melanella solidula

Scientific classification
- Kingdom: Animalia
- Phylum: Mollusca
- Class: Gastropoda
- Subclass: Caenogastropoda
- Order: Littorinimorpha
- Family: Eulimidae
- Genus: Melanella
- Species: M. solidula

Binomial name
- Melanella solidula (A. Adams & Reeve, 1850)

Synonyms
- Eulima solidula A. Adams & Reeve, 1850 superseded combination

= Melanella solidula =

Species of gastropod

Melanella solidula is a species of sea snail, a marine gastropod mollusk in the family Eulimidae. The species is one of many species known to exist within the genus, Melanella.

== Description ==
(Original description in Latin) The shell is shortly turreted, rather solid, twisted, and varicose, with nine to ten convex whorls and a small aperture. It is ivory-white.

== Distribution ==
This marine species occurs off Japan and in the China Sea.
