= Vitreolina alayoi =

Scientific classification
- Kingdom: Animalia
- Phylum: Mollusca
- Class: Gastropoda
- Subclass: Caenogastropoda
- Order: Littorinimorpha
- Family: Eulimidae
- Genus: Vitreolina
- Species: V. alayoi

Binomial name
- Vitreolina alayoi (Espinosa, Ortea & Magaña, 2001)

Synonyms
- Melanella alayoi Espinosa, Ortea & Magaña, 2001

Species of gastropod

Vitreolina alayoi is a species of sea snail, a marine gastropod mollusk in the family Eulimidae.

== Distribution and habitat ==
This species occurs in the Caribbean Sea and off Cuba.
