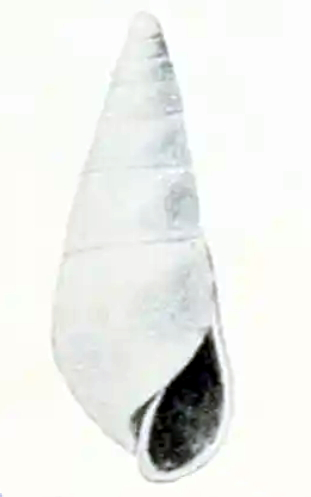
- Shell of Oceanida abreojosensis (original image)

Scientific classification
- Kingdom: Animalia
- Phylum: Mollusca
- Class: Gastropoda
- Subclass: Caenogastropoda
- Order: Littorinimorpha
- Family: Eulimidae
- Genus: Oceanida
- Species: O. abreojosensis

Binomial name
- Oceanida abreojosensis (Bartsch, 1917)

Synonyms
- Balcis abreojosensis (Bartsch, 1917) (unaccepted combination); Melanella (Melanella) abreojosensis Bartsch, 1917 superseded combination; Melanella abreojosensis Bartsch, 1917 (unaccepted combination)

= Oceanida abreojosensis =

Species of gastropod

Oceanida abreojosensis is a species of sea snail, a marine gastropod mollusk in the family Eulimidae.

== Description ==
The length of the shell attains 3.1 mm, its diameter 1 mm.

(Or!ginal description) The shell is small and acicular (needle-like), bluish-white in color, and semitranslucent. The shell contains nine whorls. The whorls are rather high between the sutures and are well rounded, being separated by a constricted suture. The surface is marked by extremely fine incremental lines and by irregularly spaced varices. The periphery is well rounded, while the base is rather protracted and well rounded as well.

The aperture is moderately large, with an acute posterior angle. The outer lip is thick within but thin at the edge. The inner lip is somewhat curved and slightly twisted, being reflected over and appressed to the base. The parietal wall is covered by a moderately thick callus.

== Distribution ==
This species occurs off the Pacific coast of Lower California, Mexico
