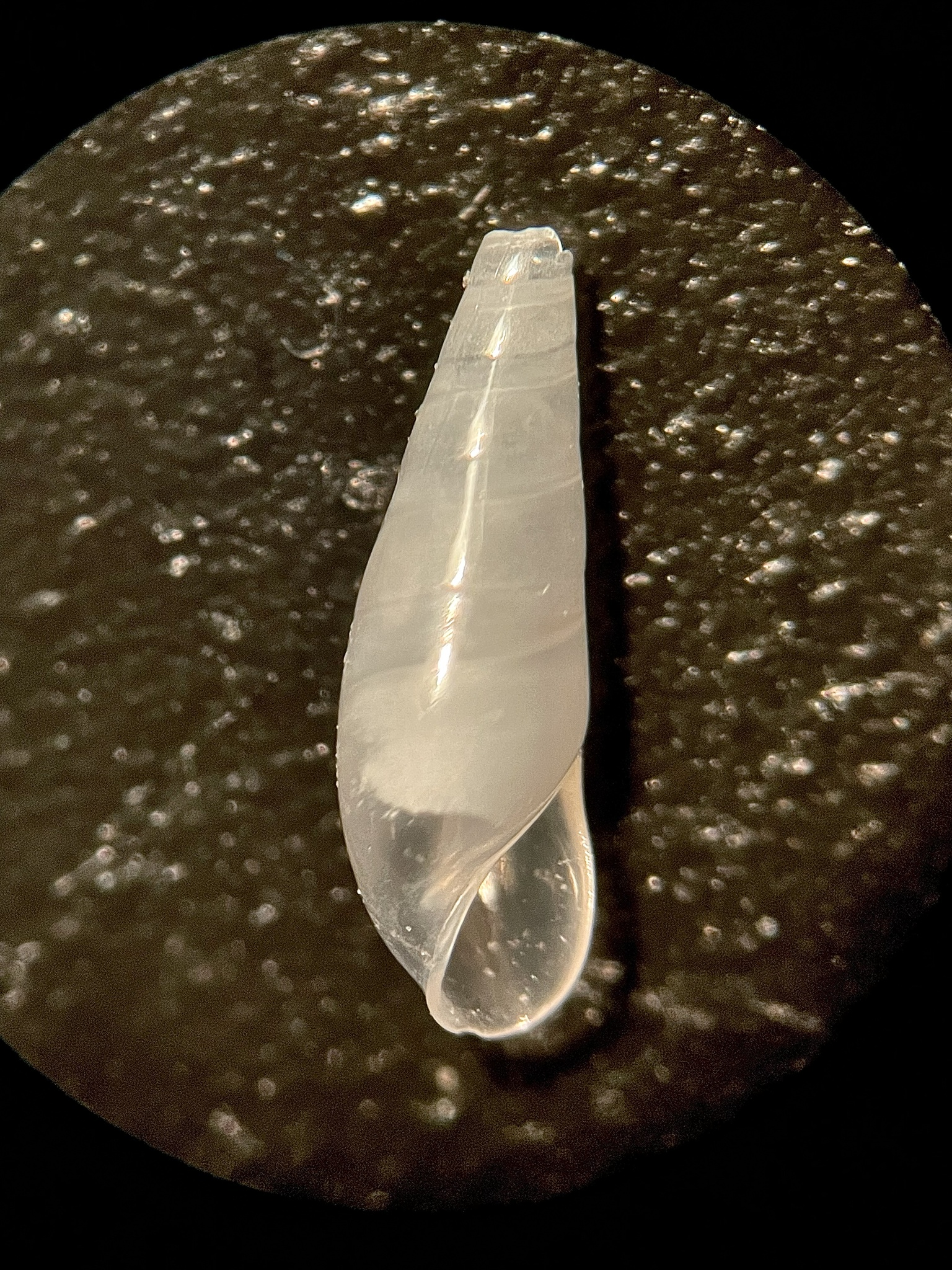

Scientific classification
- Kingdom: Animalia
- Phylum: Mollusca
- Class: Gastropoda
- Subclass: Caenogastropoda
- Order: Littorinimorpha
- Family: Eulimidae
- Genus: Vitreolina
- Species: V. bermudezi

Binomial name
- Vitreolina bermudezi (Pilsbry & Aguayo, 1933)

Synonyms
- Melanella bermudezi Pilsbry & Aguayo, 1933

= Vitreolina bermudezi =

Species of gastropod

Vitreolina bermudezi is a species of sea snail, a marine gastropod mollusk in the family Eulimidae.
