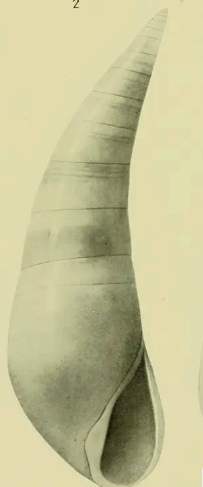
- Shell of Vitreolina columbiana (original image)

Scientific classification
- Kingdom: Animalia
- Phylum: Mollusca
- Class: Gastropoda
- Subclass: Caenogastropoda
- Order: Littorinimorpha
- Family: Eulimidae
- Genus: Vitreolina
- Species: V. columbiana

Binomial name
- Vitreolina columbiana (Bartsch, 1917)

Synonyms
- Melanella (Balcis) columbiana Bartsch, 1917 superseded combination; Melanella columbiana Bartsch, 1917 ·

= Vitreolina columbiana =

Species of gastropod

Vitreolina columbiana is a species of sea snail, a marine gastropod mollusk in the family Eulimidae. '.

== Description ==
The length of the shell attains 9.5 mm, its diameter 3 mm.

(Original description) The large shell is rather stout, and polished, with a double flexure. When it is viewed with the aperture to the front, it shows the early whorls bent backward and the succeeding whorls flexed to the right. The shell is bluish-white, except where the dried animal shines through its substance; there it has a granular, light brown to buff appearance.

The shell contains 15 whorls. The first three whorls are well rounded and are separated by a well-marked suture, while the remaining whorls are slightly rounded, with a scarcely defined suture. The posterior termination of the inside of the whorl shines through the shell and appears as a conspicuous false suture. The surface is marked by fine lines of growth only. The periphery of the body whorl is weakly angulated, and the base is strongly rounded on the left side.

The aperture is very oblique and ovate, with its posterior angle acute. The outer lip is decidedly protracted at the periphery, while the inner lip is short, curved, and slightly sinuous, reflected over and appressed to the base. The parietal wall is covered by a thick callus.

== Distribution ==
This species occurs in the Pacific Ocean off Canada.
