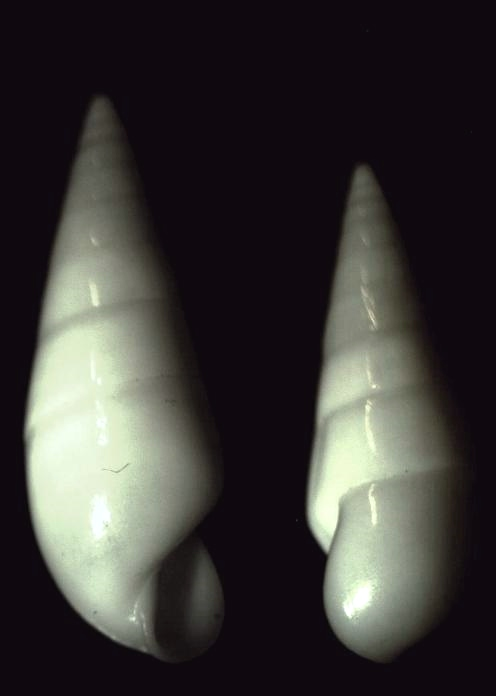
- Melanella augur

Scientific classification
- Kingdom: Animalia
- Phylum: Mollusca
- Class: Gastropoda
- Subclass: Caenogastropoda
- Order: Littorinimorpha
- Family: Eulimidae
- Genus: Melanella
- Species: M. augur

Binomial name
- Melanella augur (Angas, 1865)

Synonyms
- Eulima apheles Tenison-Woods, 1879; Eulima augur Angas, 1865; Eulima augur augur Angas, 1865; Eulima marginata Tenison-Woods, 1879; Eulima mayi Tate, 1900; Eulima murrayae Cotton & Godfrey, 1932; Eulima orthopleura Tate, 1898; Eulima planicincta Cotton & Godfrey, 1932; Eulima proxima G.B. Sowerby II, 1866; Melanella apheles Tenison-Woods, 1879; Melanella marginata Tenison-Woods, 1879; Melanella mayi Tate, 1900; Melanella murrayae Cotton & Godfrey, 1932; Melanella orthopleura Tate, 1898; Melanella planicincta Cotton & Godfrey, 1932; Melanella proxima Sowerby, 1866

= Melanella augur =

Species of gastropod

Melanella augur is a species of sea snail, a marine gastropod mollusk in the family Eulimidae. The species is one of many species known to exist within the genus, Melanella.

== Description ==
(Original description in Latin) The shell is small and rather slender, with a white, highly glossy surface. The sides of the spire are relatively straight. The apical whorls are decollate; there are normally about ten whorls, which are flattened and separated by very narrow but distinct sutures. The base is relatively short.

The aperture is somewhat oval. The columella is straight, and the outer lip is sinuate posteriorly. The inner lip is small and solid.

== Distribution ==
This marine species is endemic to Australia and occurs off South Australia, Tasmania and Victoria
