= Melanella jeffreysii =

- Shell of Melanella jeffreysii

Scientific classification
- Kingdom: Animalia
- Phylum: Mollusca
- Class: Gastropoda
- Subclass: Caenogastropoda
- Order: Littorinimorpha
- Family: Eulimidae
- Genus: Melanella
- Species: M. jeffreysii

Binomial name
- Melanella jeffreysii (Tryon, 1886)

Synonyms
- Eulima jeffreysii Tryon, 1886 (original combination); Eulima platyacme Sykes, 1903 junior subjective synonym; Eulima solida Jeffreys, 1884 (invalid; not G. B. Sowerby II, 1865); Eulima solidula Jeffreys, 1880 nomen nudum; Eulima subangulata Jeffreys, 1880 nomen nudum; Melanella platyacme (Sykes, 1903); Melanella solida (Jeffreys, 1884) (based on preoccupied original name)

Species of gastropod

Melanella jeffreysii is a species of sea snail, a marine gastropod mollusk in the family Eulimidae. The species is one of many species known to exist within the genus, Melanella.

== Description ==
The maximum recorded shell length is 5.2 mm.

(Original description) The shell is very slender, thick, transparent, and highly glossy, with a periphery that is more or less distinctly keeled. The apex is obtuse and glassy white. The shell consists of eight whorls, which are compact and flattened; the body whorl accounts for about two-fifths of the total shell length. The aperture is rather small.

== Distriution ==
This species occurs in the North Sea off Norway and in the Bay of Biscay; in the Mediterranean Sea off Italy; in the Atlantic Ocean off the Cape Verde Islands.
