= Melanella abida =

Scientific classification
- Kingdom: Animalia
- Phylum: Mollusca
- Class: Gastropoda
- Subclass: Caenogastropoda
- Order: Littorinimorpha
- Family: Eulimidae
- Genus: Melanella
- Species: M. abida

Binomial name
- Melanella abida Dall, 1927

Synonyms
- Melanella corida Dall, 1927

Species of gastropod

Melanella abida is a species of sea snail, a marine gastropod mollusk in the family Eulimidae. The species is one of many species known to exist within the genus, Melanella.

== Description ==
The maximum recorded shell length is 7 mm, its diameter 2 mm

(Original description) The small shell is solid, acute, and white. Its spire is slightly curved to the right. It has a minute, blunt apex and approximately ten whorls. The suture is obscure and scarcely impressed, while the whorls are flat and covered with a glossy glaze. The base is somewhat abruptly rounded and imperforate. No sculpture is present. The aperture is ovate; its outer lip is thin and simple, and is arcuately produced. The inner lip is short, with its anterior margin slightly narrowed in front.

== Distribution ==
This species occurs in the Atlantic Ocean off Florida.

== Habitat ==
Minimum recorded depth is 538 m. Maximum recorded depth is 538 m.
