= Melanella trunca =

- Shell of Melanella trunca (specimen at the Natural History Museum, Rotterdam)

Scientific classification
- Kingdom: Animalia
- Phylum: Mollusca
- Class: Gastropoda
- Subclass: Caenogastropoda
- Order: Littorinimorpha
- Family: Eulimidae
- Genus: Melanella
- Species: M. trunca

Binomial name
- Melanella trunca (R. B. Watson, 1897)

Synonyms
- Eulima trunca R. B. Watson, 1897 superseded combination; Melanella lutea Rodrìguez Garcìa del Castillo, 2000 junior subjective synonym

Species of gastropod

Melanella trunca is a species of sea snail, a marine gastropod mollusk in the family Eulimidae. The species is one of many species known to exist within the genus, Melanella.

== Description ==
(Original description) The conic-oblong shell is ivory-white, strong, and straight in all its lines. It has a broad, short base and a sharp tip. It possesses no true sculpture, as the entire surface is brilliantly glossy; however, a feeble, flattened varix appears on each whorl and runs interruptedly up the spire. Its colour is ivory-white, though it remains very slightly pellucid.

The spire is high and conical, marked by very straight contour-lines and whorls that are just barely rounded in outline. The apex is very small and sharp, yet it is very slightly impressed. There are nine whorls in total, which display a very slow and regular increase; the upper whorls are just barely rounded, while the lower ones are not rounded in outline at all. The body whorl is short, terminating in a truncated, well-rounded base.

The suture is hardly oblique, remaining slightly abruptly but distinctly impressed. The aperture is fairly oval, though its curve on the left-hand side is a little constricted and shortly pointed above. The outer lip is thick, ending in a rounded edge that forms a feeble, wide sinus above and a slight forward curve around the periphery of the shell. Finally, the inner lip is a good deal thickened and well defined across the body, becoming even more prominent on the columella, at the point of which lies a very shallow sinus.

== Distribution ==
This species occurs in the Atlantic Ocean off Madeira and the Western Sahara.
