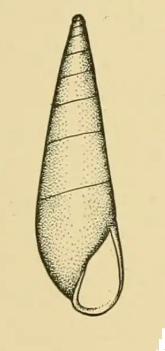
- Shell of Melanella amblytera (original drawing)

Scientific classification
- Kingdom: Animalia
- Phylum: Mollusca
- Class: Gastropoda
- Subclass: Caenogastropoda
- Order: Littorinimorpha
- Family: Eulimidae
- Genus: Melanella
- Species: M. amblytera

Binomial name
- Melanella amblytera (Verrill & Bush, 1900)

Synonyms
- Eulima amblytera Verrill & Bush, 1900; Polygireulima amblytera (Verrill & Bush, 1900)

= Melanella amblytera =

Species of gastropod

Melanella amblytera is a species of sea snail, a marine gastropod mollusk in the family Eulimidae. The species is one of many species known to exist within the genus, Melanella.

== Description ==
The length of the shell attains 5.5 mm, its diameter 0.6 mm.

(Original description) The white shell is elongate, and subfusiform, with a long, evenly tapered, nearly straight spire and a produced body whorl that is evenly rounded. The sutures are distinct but scarcely impressed and are only slightly oblique. The nearly straight outline of the spire results from the relatively flat whorls. The shell comprises up to nine whorls in the largest specimen, in addition to a relatively large, mammiform apical whorl.

The aperture is elongate-ovate, obtusely rounded, slightly expanded anteriorly, and acute posteriorly. In fully mature specimens, the anterior portion of the outer lip and the columellar margin may become thickened. The surface is smooth and brilliantly polished.

== Distribution ==
This species occurs in the Gulf of Mexico and in the Caribbean Sea; also in the tropical Northwestern Atlantic: Floridian, Bermuda, Bahamian, Southern Caribbean; tropical Southwestern Atlantic: Eastern Brazil.
