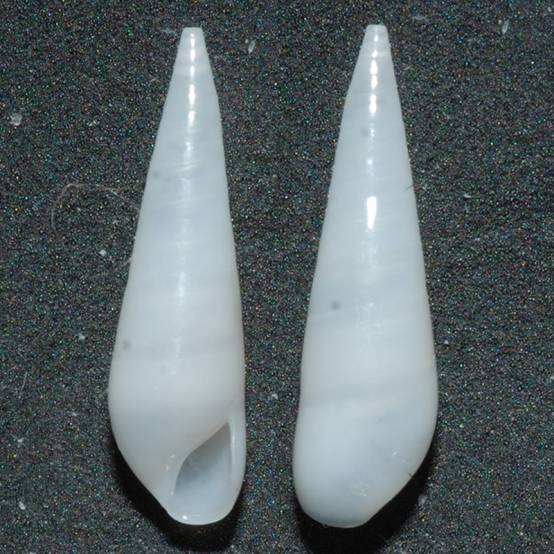
- Shell of Melanella acicula

Scientific classification
- Kingdom: Animalia
- Phylum: Mollusca
- Class: Gastropoda
- Subclass: Caenogastropoda
- Order: Littorinimorpha
- Family: Eulimidae
- Genus: Melanella
- Species: M. acicula

Binomial name
- Melanella acicula Gould, 1849

Synonyms
- Cuspeulima iredalei Laseron, 1955; Eulima acicularis A. Adams, 1861; Eulima pisorum Pilsbry, 1917; Eulima vitrea A. Adams, 1854; Leiostraca aciculata [sic] (misspelling); Melanella iredalei Laseron, 1955; Melanella pisorum Pilsbry, 1917; Stilifer acicula Gould, 1859

= Melanella acicula =

Species of gastropod

Melanella acicula is a species of sea snail, a marine gastropod mollusk in the family Eulimidae. This species is one of many species known to exist within the genus, Melanella

== Description ==
(Original description in Latin) The small shell is imperforate, and elongated-subulate, tapering to a very sharp point. Toward the apex, it is perfectly smooth and very gradually twisted. The surface is extremely glossy, and the shell is livid-white or milky in colour, sometimes with a yellowish tinge.

The spire consists of as many as twelve flattened whorls, which are separated by a distinct, shining suture. The aperture is narrow and oval. The outer lip is simple, curves forward in a gentle arch, and is produced anteriorly. The columella is only slightly curved.

== Distribution ==
This species occurs in the Indo-West Pacific; also off Korea, Japan, New Caledonia and Australia (New South Wales, Queensland)
