= Melanella polita =

- Shell of Melanella polita

Scientific classification
- Kingdom: Animalia
- Phylum: Mollusca
- Class: Gastropoda
- Subclass: Caenogastropoda
- Order: Littorinimorpha
- Family: Eulimidae
- Genus: Melanella
- Species: M. polita

Binomial name
- Melanella polita (Linnaeus, 1758)

Synonyms
- Eulima altimirai Nordsieck, 1977; Eulima glaberrima Risso, 1826 (dubious synonym); Eulima intermedia Cantraine, 1835; Eulima polita (Linnaeus, 1758); Eulima polita var. recta Requien, 1849; Melanella intermedia (Cantraine, 1835); Melanella recta (Réquien, 1849); Melanella rubrotincta (Jeffreys, 1867); Melanella sinuosa (Scacchi, 1836); Polygireulima polita (Linnaeus, 1758); Rissoa sinuosa Scacchi, 1836; Turbo politus Linnaeus, 1758 (original combination)

Species of gastropod

Melanella polita is a species of small sea snail, a marine gastropod mollusk in the family Eulimidae. It was formerly assigned to the genus Eulima.

This specie s was one of the first to be assigned to the major genus Melanella of the family Eulimidae.

== Description ==
(Original description in Latin by Linnaeus) The shell is turreted, imperforate, and extremely smooth; the aperture is ovate. The shell is the size of a barley grain, very white, opaque and not translucent, and highly polished. The whorls are separated by a thin, impressed line.

The shell is univalve, spiral, somewhat translucent, and fragile. The aperture is contracted, and internally lunate [crescent-shaped] or somewhat rounded: resembling a segment of a circle removed [cut away]. The shell is longitudinally angled on both sides.

== Distribution ==
This species occurs in the North Atlantic Ocean and in the Mediterranean Sea (off Greece).
