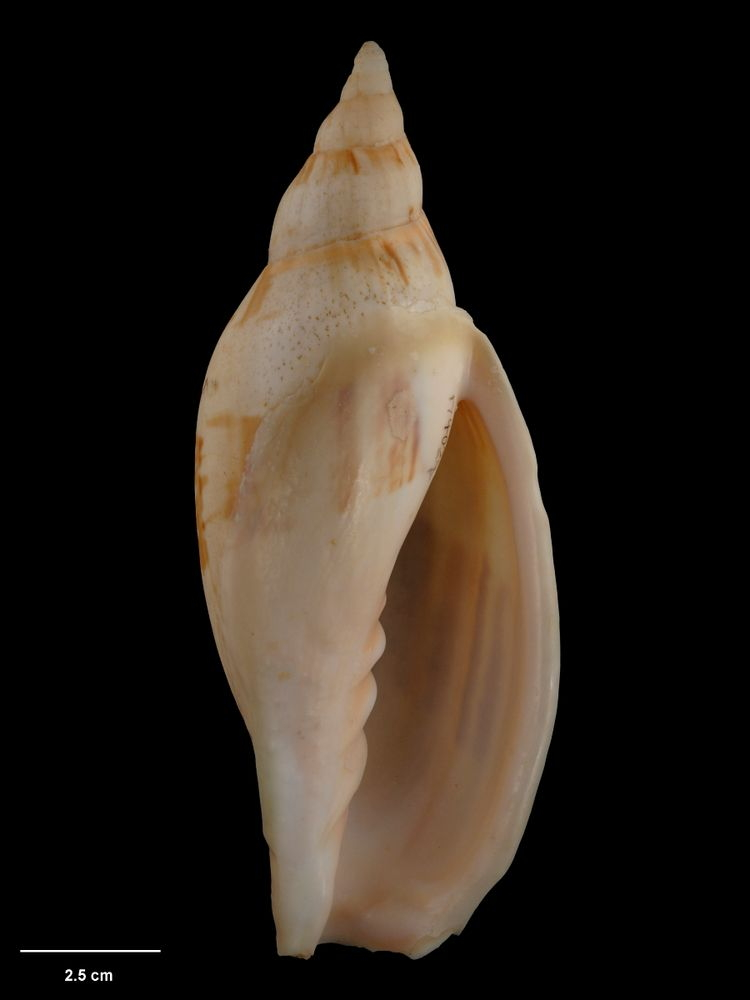
- Shell of Alcithoe fissurata crassa (holotype at the Museum of New Zealand)

Scientific classification
- Kingdom: Animalia
- Phylum: Mollusca
- Class: Gastropoda
- Subclass: Caenogastropoda
- Order: Neogastropoda
- Family: Volutidae
- Genus: Alcithoe
- Species: A. fissurata

Binomial name
- Alcithoe fissurata Dell, 1963

Synonyms
- Pachymelon fissurata Dell, 1963

= Alcithoe fissurata =

Species of gastropod

Alcithoe fissurata is a species of sea snail, a marine gastropod mollusc in the family Volutidae, the volutes.

== Subspecies ==
- Alcithoe fissurata crassa Bail & Limpus, 2005
- Alcithoe fissurata elegans Bail & Limpus, 2005
- Alcithoe fissurata fissurata (Dell, 1963)

== Description ==
The length of the shell attains 260 mm, its diameter is 93 mm.

== Distribution ==
This marine species is endemic to New Zealand occurs off Northland in deep water: 360–870 metres.
