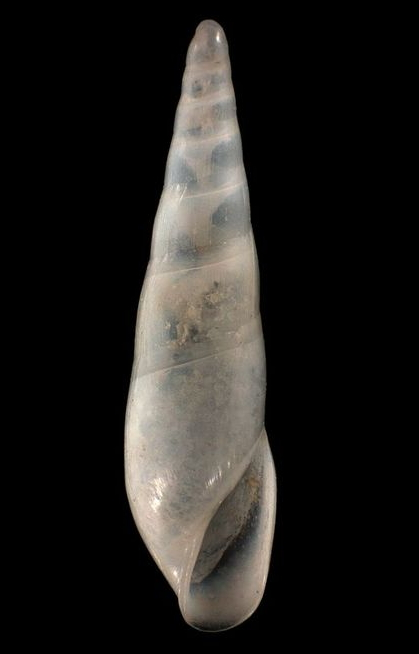
- Shell of Melanella puhana (holotype at Museum of New Zealand Te Papa Tongarewa)

Scientific classification
- Kingdom: Animalia
- Phylum: Mollusca
- Class: Gastropoda
- Subclass: Caenogastropoda
- Order: Littorinimorpha
- Family: Eulimidae
- Genus: Melanella
- Species: M. puhana

Binomial name
- Melanella puhana (Dell, 1956)

Synonyms
- Balcis puhana Dell, 1956

= Melanella puhana =

Species of gastropod

Melanella puhana is a species of sea snail, a marine gastropod mollusk in the family Eulimidae. The species is one of many species known to exist within the genus, Melanella.

== Description ==
The length of the shell attains 6 mm, its diameter is 1.5 mm.

== Distribution ==
This marine species is endemic to New Zealand and occurs off south-eastern North Island, eastern South Island and Chatham Islands, at depths between 476 m and 1,463 m.
