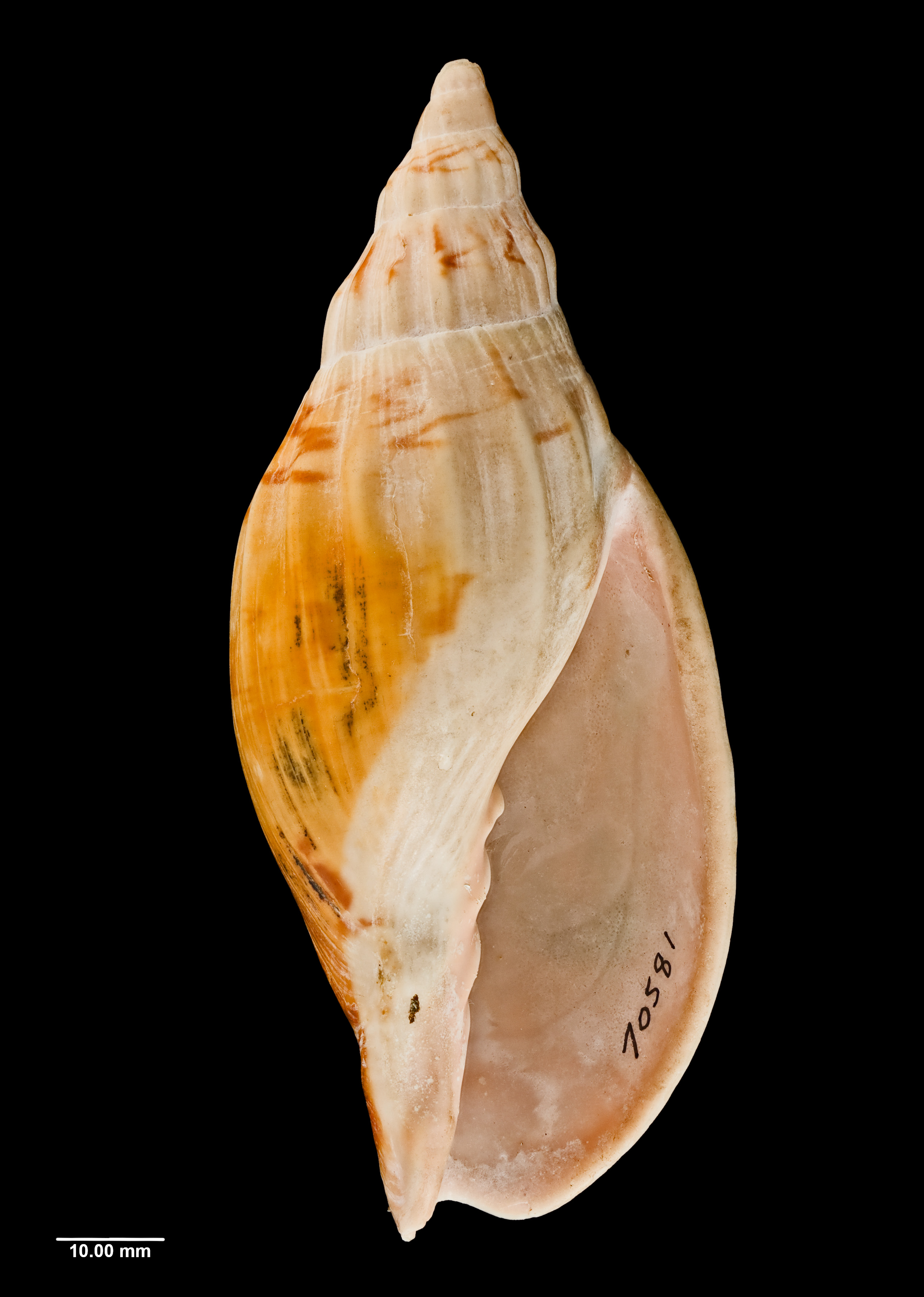
- Holotype from the Auckland War Memorial Museum

Scientific classification
- Kingdom: Animalia
- Phylum: Mollusca
- Class: Gastropoda
- Subclass: Caenogastropoda
- Order: Neogastropoda
- Family: Volutidae
- Genus: Alcithoe
- Species: A. wilsonae

Binomial name
- Alcithoe wilsonae (A. W. B. Powell, 1933)

Synonyms
- Alcithoe chathamensis (Dell, 1956); Alcithoe knoxi (Dell, 1956); Alcithoe wilsonae acuminata Bail & Limpus, 2005; Alcithoe wilsonae wilsonae (Powell, 1933); Leporemax chathamensis Dell, 1956; Pachymelon grahami Powell, 1965; Pachymelon smithi Powell, 1950; Pachymelon wilsonae Powell, 1933; Pachymelon (Palomelon) grahami Powell, 1965; Pachymelon (Palomelon) smithi Powell, 1950; Pachymelon (Palomelon) wilsonae Powell, 1933 (original combination); Palomelon grahami Powell, 1965; Palomelon smithi Powell, 1950; Palomelon wilsonae Powell, 1933; Teremelon knoxi Dell, 1956

= Alcithoe wilsonae =

Species of gastropod

Alcithoe wilsonae is a species of sea snail, a marine gastropod mollusc in the family Volutidae, the volutes. A highly morphologically varied species, it endemic to New Zealand, found on the Chatham Rise, off the coast of the eastern South Island, and on a section of the Campbell Plateau between the South Island and the Auckland Islands.

== Description ==
In the original description, Powell described the species as follows:

Shell large, solid, fusiform. Spire half height of aperture. Nucleus damaged. Post-embryonic whorls 5, spire whorls sub-angled at the middle, body-whorl moderately inflated, contracting gradually to a feeble fasciole. Sculpture consisting of narrow axial ribs, extending from suture to suture on the spire whorls, and to just below the periphery on the body-whorl. These axials are thickened slightly in the middle, where they cross the subangle. On the last half-whorl they become sub-obsolete. There are 14 axials on the penultimate whorl and 12 on the ante-penultimate. Aperture elongate, with a moderately wide but very shallow basal notch. Columella straight, with four strong oblique plaits, upper-most strongest, lower three becoming weaker in descending order. Inner-lip spread as a thin glaze in one wide sweep over the body-whorl. Colour pinkish-buff, maculated with three zones of irregular zigzag markings of dark reddish-brown. Upper band below suture, middle band at periphery, and lower one bordering the fasciole.

The holotype of the species measures 109 mm (4.3 in) in height (112 mm (4.4 in) estimated undamaged height) and 47 mm (1.9 in) in diameter. The species has four strong pillar plaits. It is a highly morphologically variable species.

== Taxonomy ==
A. wilsonae was first described by A.W.B. Powell in 1933, using the name Pachymelon (Palomelon) wilsonae. The holotype was collected from Owenga Beach in the Chatham Islands by Miss B. M. Wilson in 1933. In 1978, Richard Dell synonymised Pachymelon with the genus Alcithoe, recombining the species as Alcithoe wilsonae. In the same paper, Dell synonymised Pachymelon (Palomelon) grahami and Pachymelon (Palomelon) smithi with Alcithoe wilsonae. In 2011, A. knoxi was synonymised with A. wilsonae.

The species likely diverged from other members of Alcithoe between 4.6 and 13.1 million years ago.

== Distribution and habitat ==
The species is endemic to New Zealand, found in the waters of the Chatham Rise, the eastern South Island and a section of the Campbell Plateau between the South Island and the Auckland Islands. The fossil record extends back to the Tongaporutuan stage of the Cenozoic Era (between 10,920,000 and 6,500,000 years ago).

== Gallery ==
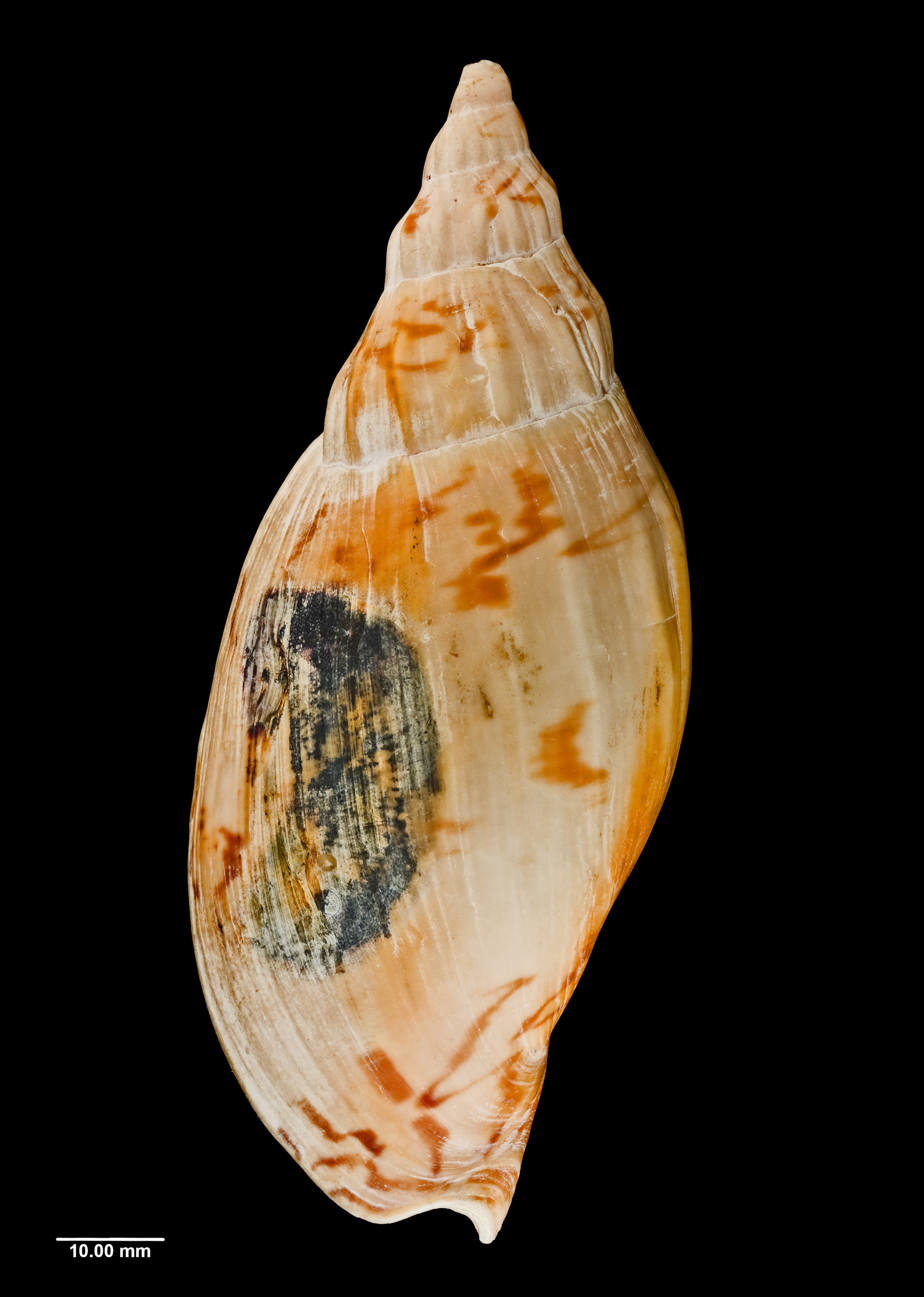
Reverse view of holotype

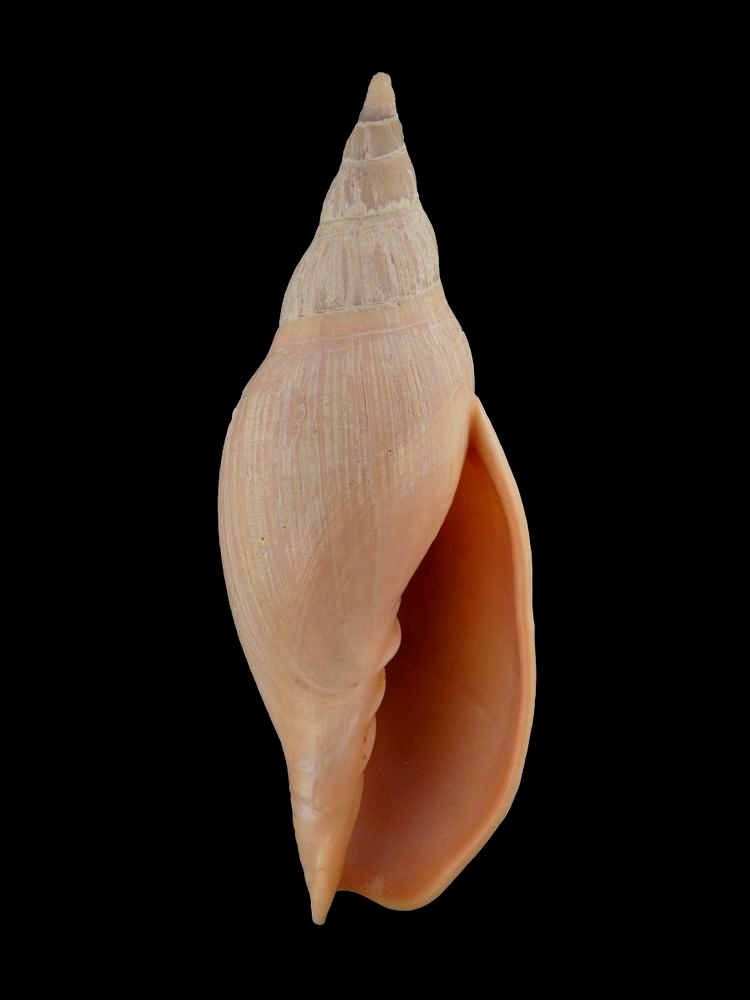
Type specimen (holotype of Alcithoe wilsonae acuminata)

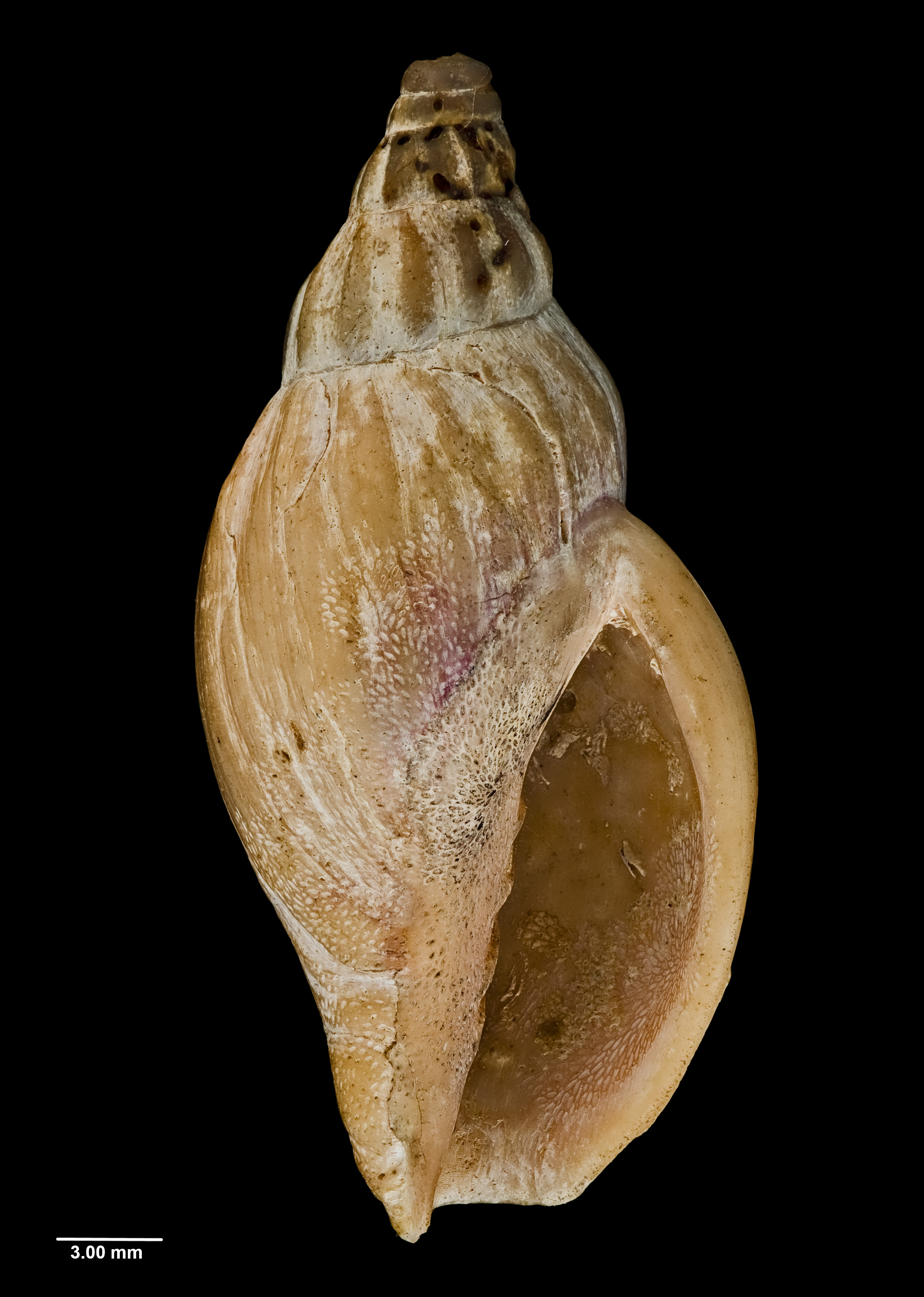
Type specimen (holotype of Pachymelon (Palomelon) grahami)

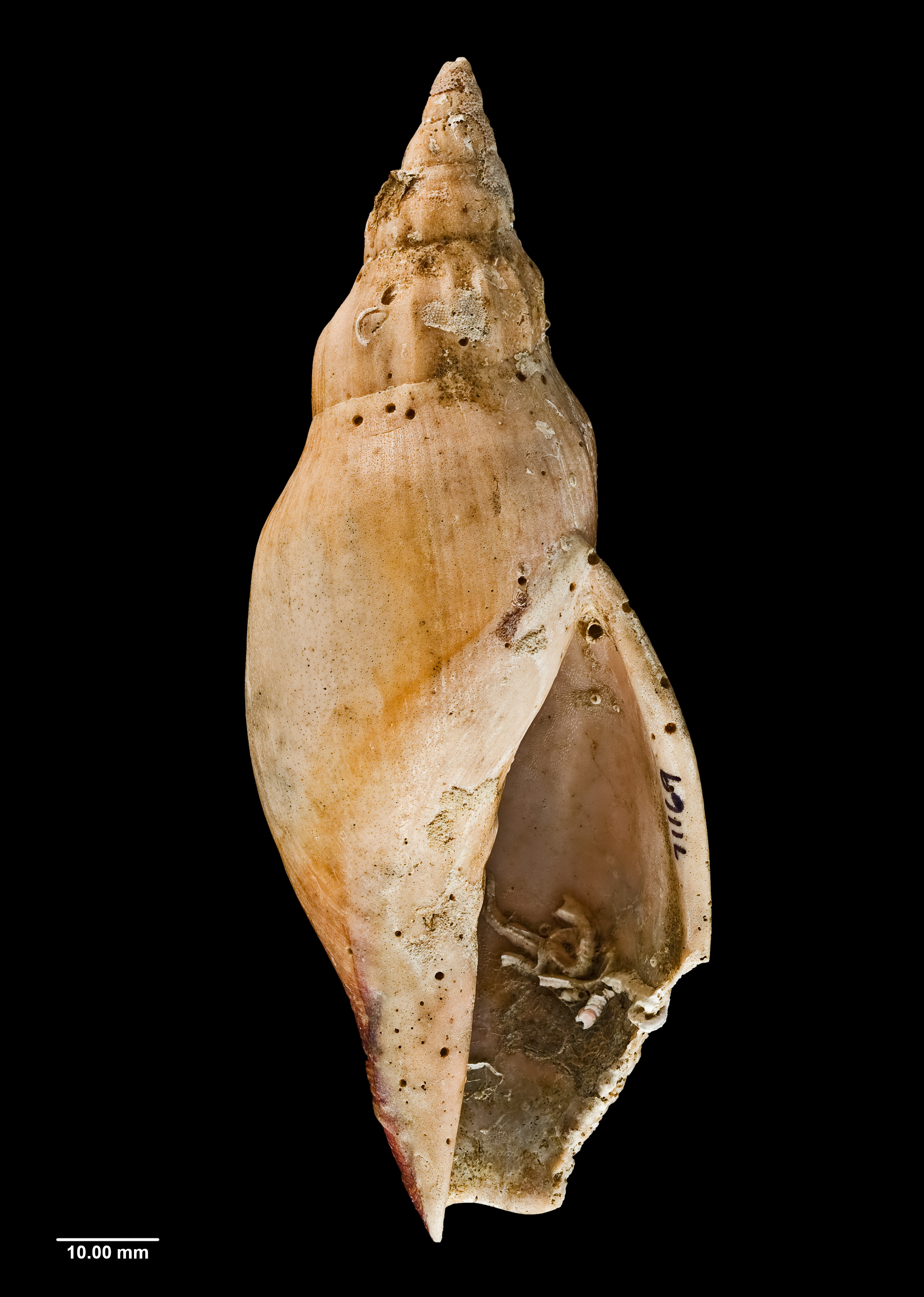
Type specimen (holotype of Pachymelon (Palomelon) smithi)

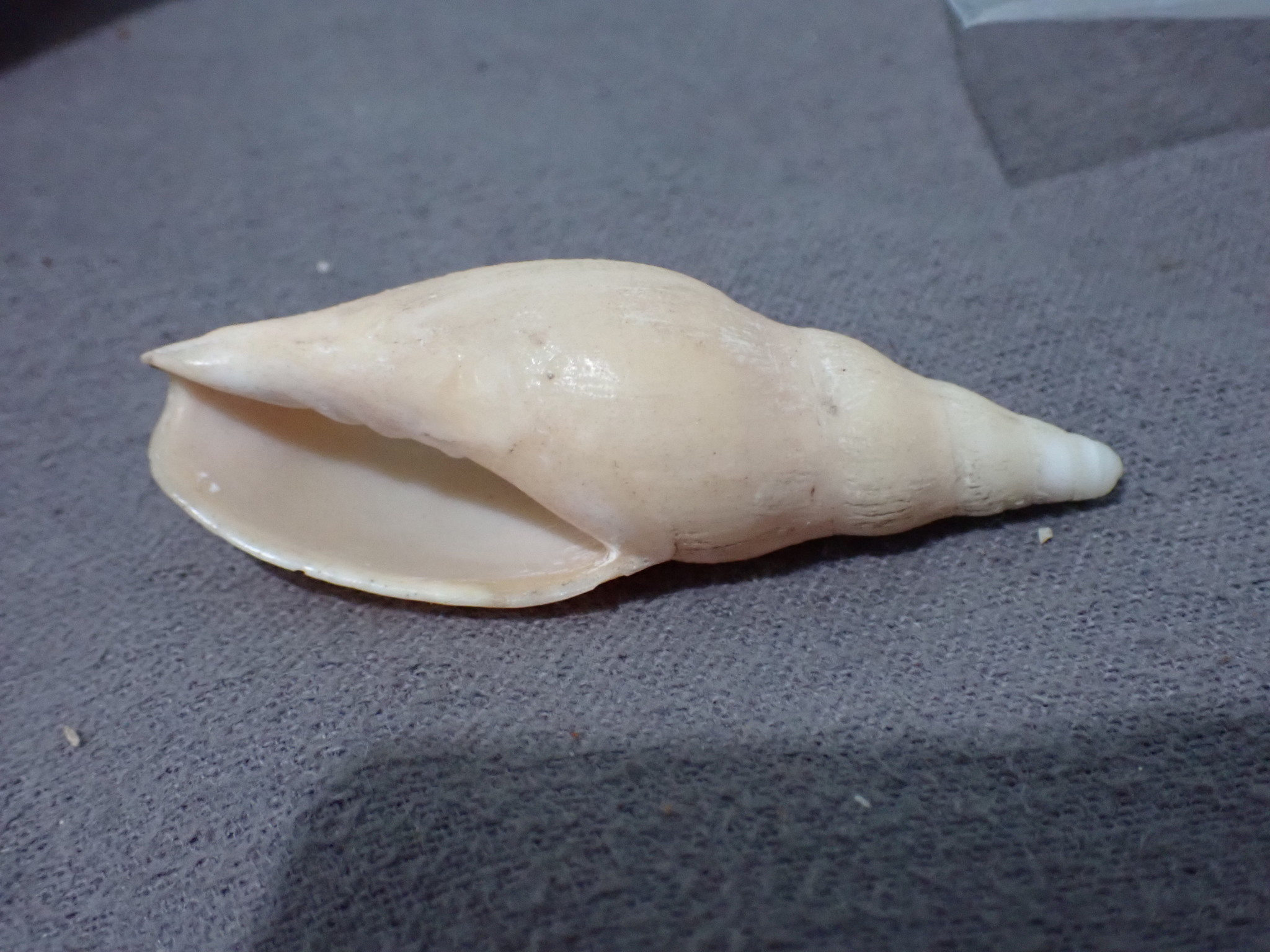
Shell found near the Auckland Islands

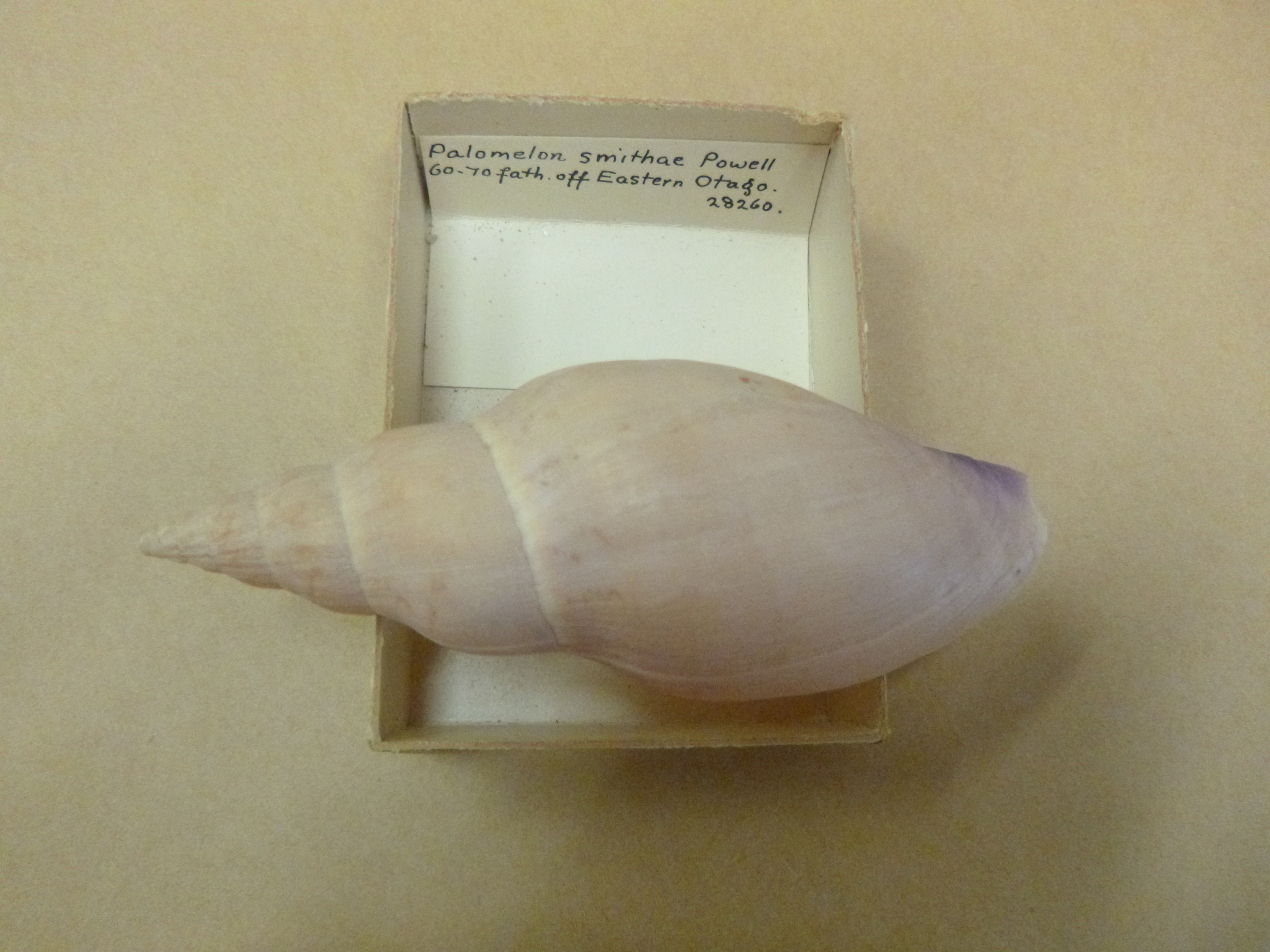
Shell found off the coast of eastern Otago
