= Alcithoe larochei ostenfeldi =

Scientific classification
- Kingdom: Animalia
- Phylum: Mollusca
- Class: Gastropoda
- Subclass: Caenogastropoda
- Order: Neogastropoda
- Family: Volutidae
- Genus: Alcithoe
- Species: A. larochei
- Subspecies: A. l. ostenfeldi

Trinomial name
- Alcithoe larochei ostenfeldi (Iredale, 1937)

Synonyms
- Alcithoe ostenfeldi (Iredale, 1937); Gilvostia ostenfeldi Iredale, 1937 (original combination)

Species of gastropod

Alcithoe larochei ostenfeldi is a subspecies of very large sea snail, a marine gastropod mollusc in the family Volutidae, the volutes.

== Description ==
The height of this shell attains 170 mm (6.7 in), its width is 73 mm (2.9 in).

== Distribution ==
This marine subspecies is endemic to New Zealand.
