= Alcithoe hedleyi =

Scientific classification
- Kingdom: Animalia
- Phylum: Mollusca
- Class: Gastropoda
- Subclass: Caenogastropoda
- Order: Neogastropoda
- Family: Volutidae
- Genus: Alcithoe
- Species: A. hedleyi

Binomial name
- Alcithoe hedleyi (Murdoch and Suter, 1906)

Species of gastropod

Alcithoe hedleyi is a species of medium-sized sea snail, a marine gastropod mollusc in the family Volutidae, the volutes.
