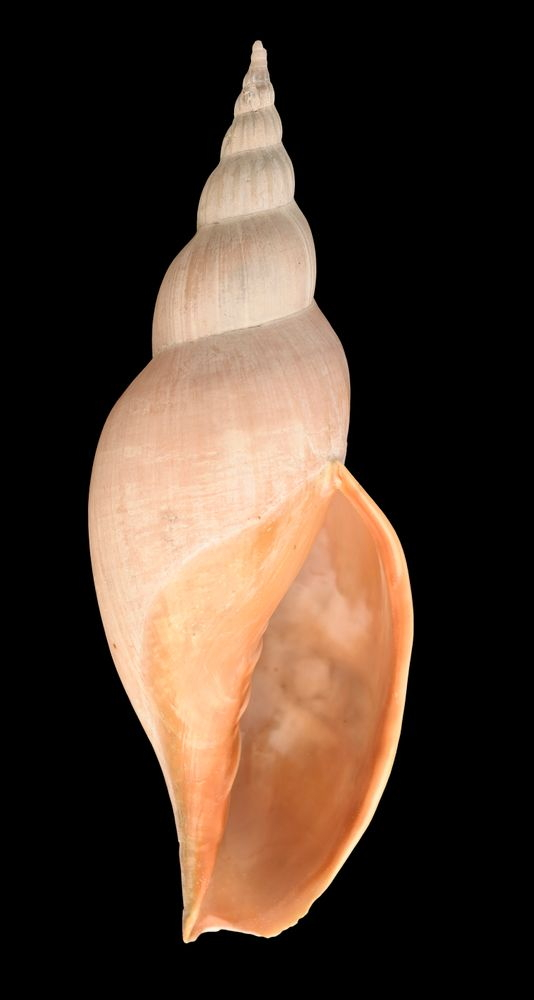
- Shell of Alcithoe benthicola (specimen at the Museum of New Zealand)

Scientific classification
- Kingdom: Animalia
- Phylum: Mollusca
- Class: Gastropoda
- Subclass: Caenogastropoda
- Order: Neogastropoda
- Family: Volutidae
- Genus: Alcithoe
- Species: A. benthicola

Binomial name
- Alcithoe benthicola (Dell, 1963)

Synonyms
- Pachymelon benthicola Dell, 1963

= Alcithoe benthicola =

Species of gastropod

Alcithoe benthicola is a species of very large deepwater sea snail, a marine prosobranch gastropod mollusc in the family Volutidae, the volutes.

== Description ==
This species attains a size of 260 mm, its diameter is 145 mm.

== Distribution ==
This marine species is endemic to New Zealand occurs off Northland in deep water: 400–800 metres.
