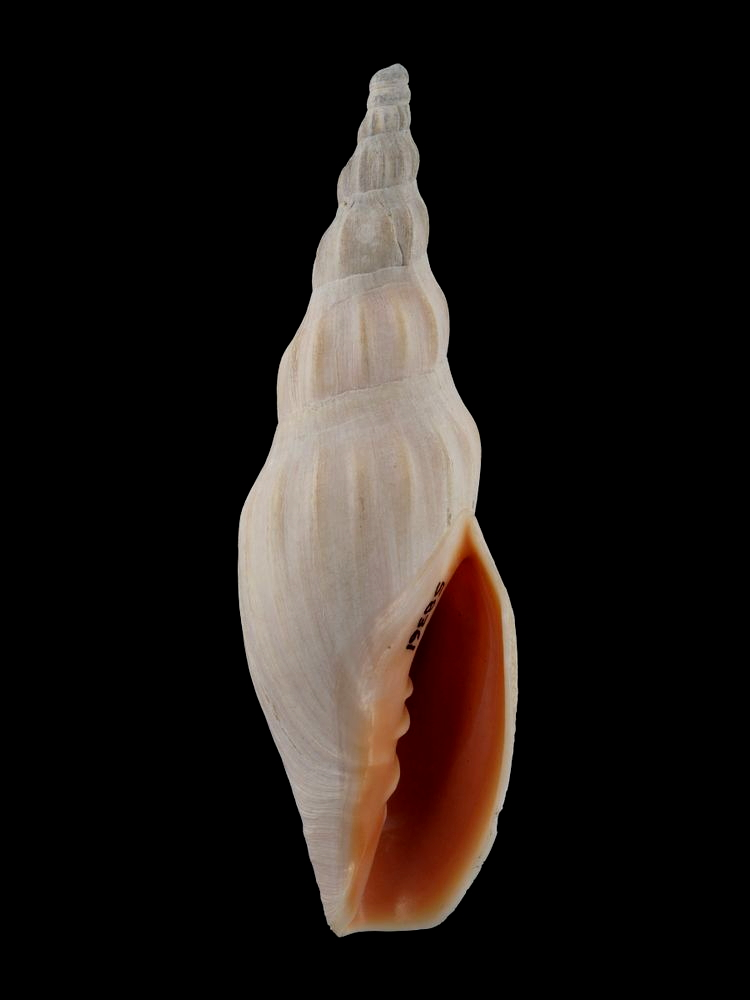
- Shell of Alcithoe flemingi (holotype in the Museum of New Zealand)

Scientific classification
- Kingdom: Animalia
- Phylum: Mollusca
- Class: Gastropoda
- Subclass: Caenogastropoda
- Order: Neogastropoda
- Family: Volutidae
- Genus: Alcithoe
- Species: A. flemingi

Binomial name
- Alcithoe flemingi Dell, 1978

= Alcithoe flemingi =

Species of gastropod

Alcithoe flemingi is a species of large sea snail, a marine gastropod mollusc in the family Volutidae, the volutes.

== Description ==
This species attains a size of 105 mm, its diameter 32 mm.

== Habitat ==
This volute is endemic to New Zealand and lives in deep water off the Chatham Rise, off Auckland and the Campbell Islands.
