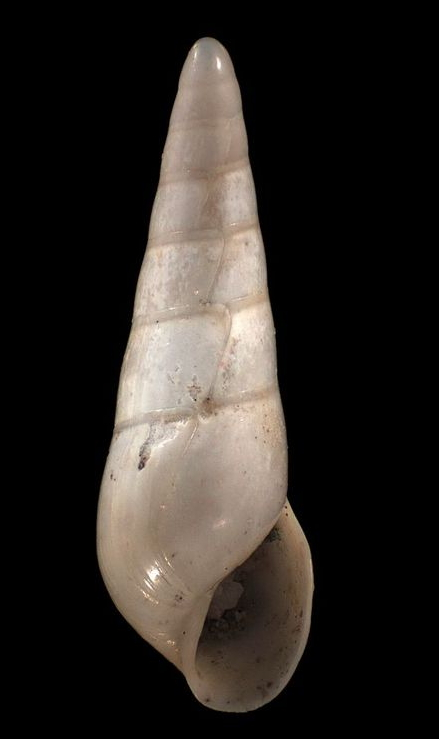
- Shell of Melanella alertae (holotype at Museum of New Zealand Te Papa Tongarewa)

Scientific classification
- Kingdom: Animalia
- Phylum: Mollusca
- Class: Gastropoda
- Subclass: Caenogastropoda
- Order: Littorinimorpha
- Family: Eulimidae
- Genus: Melanella
- Species: M. alertae

Binomial name
- Melanella alertae (Dell, 1956)

Synonyms
- Balcis alertae Dell, 1956

= Melanella alertae =

Species of gastropod

Melanella alertae is a species of sea snail, a marine gastropod mollusk in the family Eulimidae. The species is one of many species known to exist within the genus, Melanella.

== Description ==
The length of the shell attains 4.5mm, its diameter 1.3 mm.

== Distribution ==
This marine species is endemic to New Zealand and occurs off south-eastern South Island, at depths between 475 m and 640 m
