= Gibberula hardingae =

Scientific classification
- Kingdom: Animalia
- Phylum: Mollusca
- Class: Gastropoda
- Subclass: Caenogastropoda
- Order: Neogastropoda
- Family: Cystiscidae
- Subfamily: Cystiscinae
- Genus: Gibberula
- Species: G. hardingae

Binomial name
- Gibberula hardingae (Dell, 1956)

Synonyms
- Marginella (Kogomea) hardingae Dell, 1956

Species of gastropod

Gibberula hardingae is a species of sea snail, a marine gastropod mollusk, in the family Cystiscidae.

== Distribution ==
This species occurs in New Zealand Exclusive Economic Zone.
