= Alcithoe davegibbsi =

Conservation status
- Declining (NZ TCS)

Scientific classification
- Kingdom: Animalia
- Phylum: Mollusca
- Class: Gastropoda
- Subclass: Caenogastropoda
- Order: Neogastropoda
- Family: Volutidae
- Genus: Alcithoe
- Species: A. davegibbsi

Binomial name
- Alcithoe davegibbsi M. Hart, 1999

Species of gastropod

Alcithoe davegibbsi is a species of medium-sized sea snail, a marine gastropod mollusc in the family Volutidae.

== Description ==
The length of the shell attains 55 mm, its diameter 26 mm.

== Distribution ==
This marine species is endemic to New Zealand and occurs off Spirits Bay, North Island.
