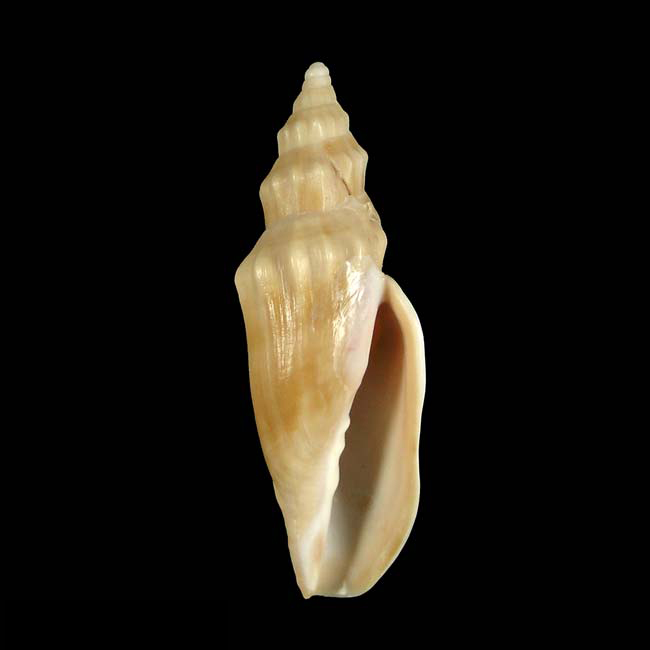

Scientific classification
- Kingdom: Animalia
- Phylum: Mollusca
- Class: Gastropoda
- Subclass: Caenogastropoda
- Order: Neogastropoda
- Family: Volutidae
- Genus: Alcithoe
- Species: A. aillaudorum

Binomial name
- Alcithoe aillaudorum Bouchet & Poppe, 1988

= Alcithoe aillaudorum =

Species of gastropod

Alcithoe aillaudorum is a species of sea snail, a marine gastropod mollusk in the family Volutidae, the volutes.

== Distribution ==
This marine species occurs off New Zealand.
