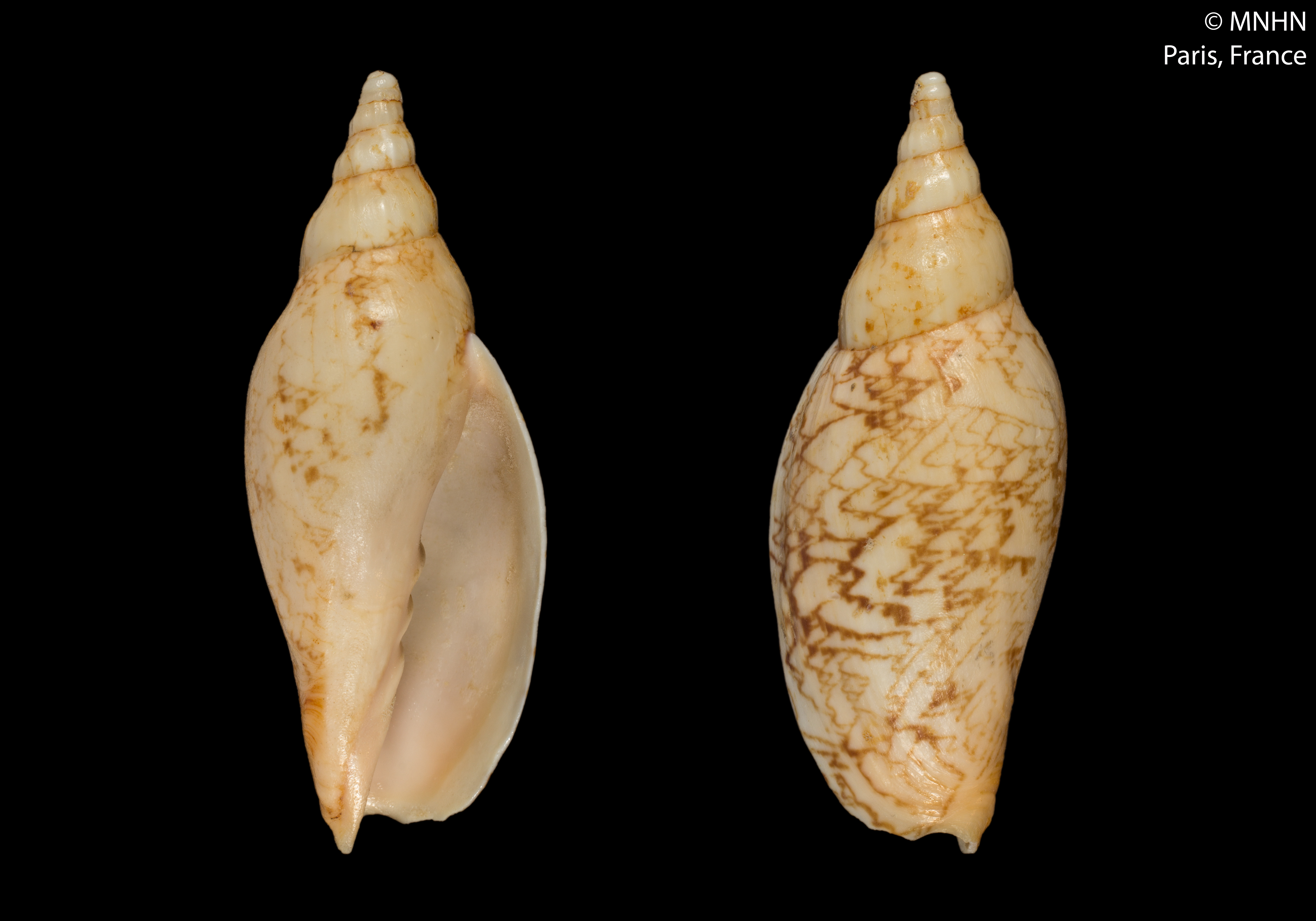
- Shell of Alcithoe fusus (neotype at MNHN, Paris)

Scientific classification
- Kingdom: Animalia
- Phylum: Mollusca
- Class: Gastropoda
- Subclass: Caenogastropoda
- Order: Neogastropoda
- Superfamily: Volutoidea
- Family: Volutidae
- Genus: Alcithoe
- Species: A. fusus

Binomial name
- Alcithoe fusus Quoy and Gaimard, 1833

Synonyms
- Alcithoe (Leporemax) fusus (Quoy & Gaimard, 1833); Alcithoe (Leporemax) fusus haurakiensis Dell, 1956; Alcithoe fusus fusus (Quoy & Gaimard, 1833); Alcithoe fusus haurakiensis Dell, 1956; Alcithoe fusus hedleyi (Murdoch & Suter, 1906); Fulgoraria (Alcithoe) hedleyi Murdoch & Suter, 1906; Fulguraria (Alcithoe) hedleyi Murdoch & Suter, 1906; Leporemax fusus (Quoy & Gaimard, 1833); Leporemax fusus var. ruahiniensis R. M. Carter, 1972 (invalid: infrasubspecific name); Voluta (Alcithoe) subplicata Hutton, 1873; Voluta fusus Quoy & Gaimard, 1833; Voluta gracilis Swainson, 1824

= Alcithoe fusus =

Species of gastropod

Alcithoe fusus is a species of medium-sized sea snail, a marine gastropod mollusc in the family Volutidae, the volutes.

== Description ==
The length of the shell attains 84 mm, its diameter 35 mm.

(Described as Fulguraria (Alcithoe) hedleyi Murdoch & Suter, 1906) Shell: Elongate-fusiform, with a rather long, acuminate spire and costate structure. The body whorl is smooth, adorned with fine longitudinal zigzag markings, and the columella has four folds.

Sculpture: The protoconch features one or two spiral threads, while the subsequent spire whorls are distantly longitudinally costate. These ribs extend over the lower two-thirds of each whorl, with ten ribs per volution. A few ribs are located on the body above the aperture, but the remainder is smooth. Growth lines are visible on all whorls, more distinct and closer together on the body whorl. Using a lens, numerous spiral lines can be discerned below the shoulder of the whorls.

Color: The actual color of live specimens is unknown, but the shell is presumed to be light-fulvous. Fine longitudinal brown zigzag lines decorate all the whorls, except the protoconch.

Spire: The spire is much shorter than the aperture. It is conical, acuminate but obtuse. The protoconch consists of two slightly bulbous whorls, with the nucleus being slightly lateral and smooth. The second whorl has one or two spiral threads.

Whorls: There are 7 shouldered whorls, which initially increase in height slowly and then more rapidly. The suture is distinct but not impressed, becoming retrocurrent upon reaching the aperture.

Aperture: Long and narrow, slightly canaliculated at the upper angle, and very slightly narrowed at the base, where it is broadly truncated and sinuated. The outer lip forms a gentle curve, is nearly straight, thickened and rounded above, and thinner near the base, remaining smooth and not expanded. The inner lip is thin and shiny, broadly expanded on the body whorl with a few longitudinal striae, and narrower on the columella. The columella is slightly excavated near the middle and features four almost equidistant, very oblique strong plaits of nearly equal size. The columella narrows into a sharply rounded beak, extending beyond the basal margin of the outer lip.

== Distribution ==
This marine species is endemic to New Zealand and occurs off North Island and South Island to Otago.
