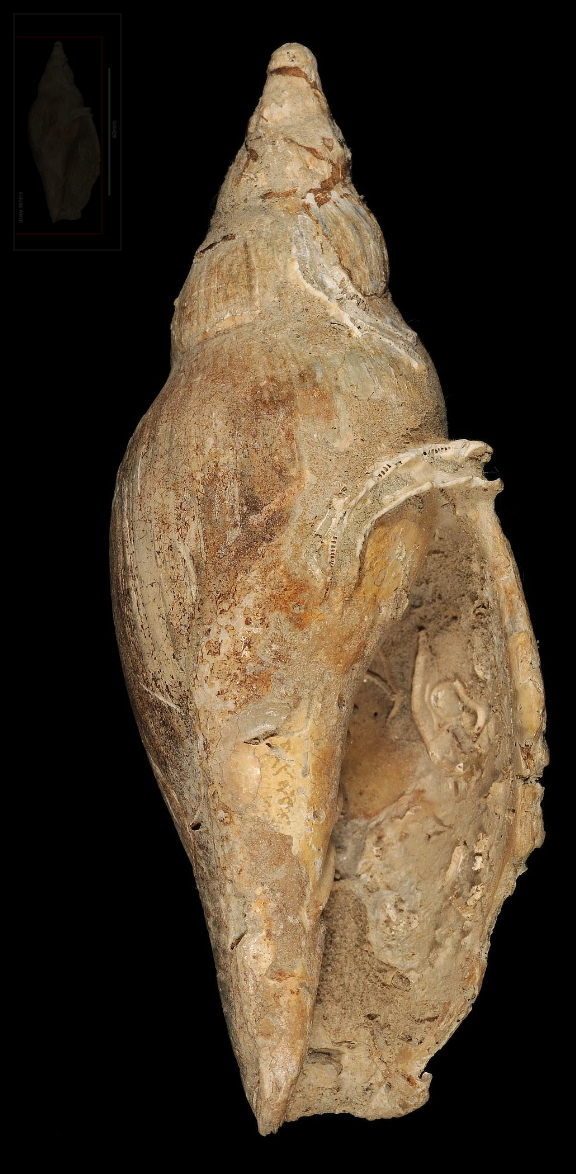
- Shell of Alcithoe lutea (specimen at the Smithsonian Institution)

Conservation status
- Not Threatened (NZ TCS)

Scientific classification
- Kingdom: Animalia
- Phylum: Mollusca
- Class: Gastropoda
- Subclass: Caenogastropoda
- Order: Neogastropoda
- Family: Volutidae
- Genus: Alcithoe
- Species: A. lutea

Binomial name
- Alcithoe lutea (Watson, 1882)

Synonyms
- Cymbiola lutea Watson, 1882; Voluta lutea (R. B. Watson, 1882) (superseded combination); Waihaoia (Palomelon) lutea (R. B. Watson, 1882) (superseded combination); Waihaoia lutea (R. B. Watson, 1882) (superseded combination)

= Alcithoe lutea =

Species of gastropod

Alcithoe lutea is a species of large deepwater sea snail, a marine gastropod mollusc in the family Volutidae, the volutes.

== Description ==
The length of the shell attains 85 mm, its diameter 38 mm.

(Original description) The shell is fusiform, robust, pale buff with a high, blunt spire. It features a relatively large aperture, a slightly reverted outer lip, and four teeth on the columella.

Sculpture:

- Longitudinals: the upper whorls have a few slight, narrow ribs that become almost obsolete on the later whorls. The lines of growth are numerous and hair-like.
- The spirals are completely absent. The columellar swelling in front is very small and slight.

The color of the shell is ashy white over pale buff, completely matte. The outer lip and body glaze are rich buff, becoming paler inward.

The spire is high and slightly irregularly bent, subscalar with a blunt, mamillary, and with an impressed apex.

There are 6¾ convex whorls, contracting above into the suture, and perpendicular below. After the first three, the whorls increase rapidly in size. The body whorl is slightly ventricose, long, and attenuated in front. The suture is oblique, slightly impressed, and irregular.

The aperture is long, but not wide. It is oblique, with nearly parallel sides. It is bluntly pointed above, ending in a broad, shallow, slightly emarginated canal with a minute border at the base.

The outer lip is patulous, thin, but expanded and rounded at the edge. It rises on the penultimate whorl at its junction and forms a slight sinus with a very reverted edge. The inner lip spreads widely as a thin glaze over the body whorl. It is scarcely convex above, hardly concave in the middle, and perpendicular below, where there are four pale-colored, very oblique teeth that are not very strong. The inner lip is obliquely cut off, twisted, and rounded into a prominent thin point at the front.

== Distribution ==
This marine species is endemic to New Zealand and occurs off the Challenger Plateau at depths between 400 m and 600 m.
