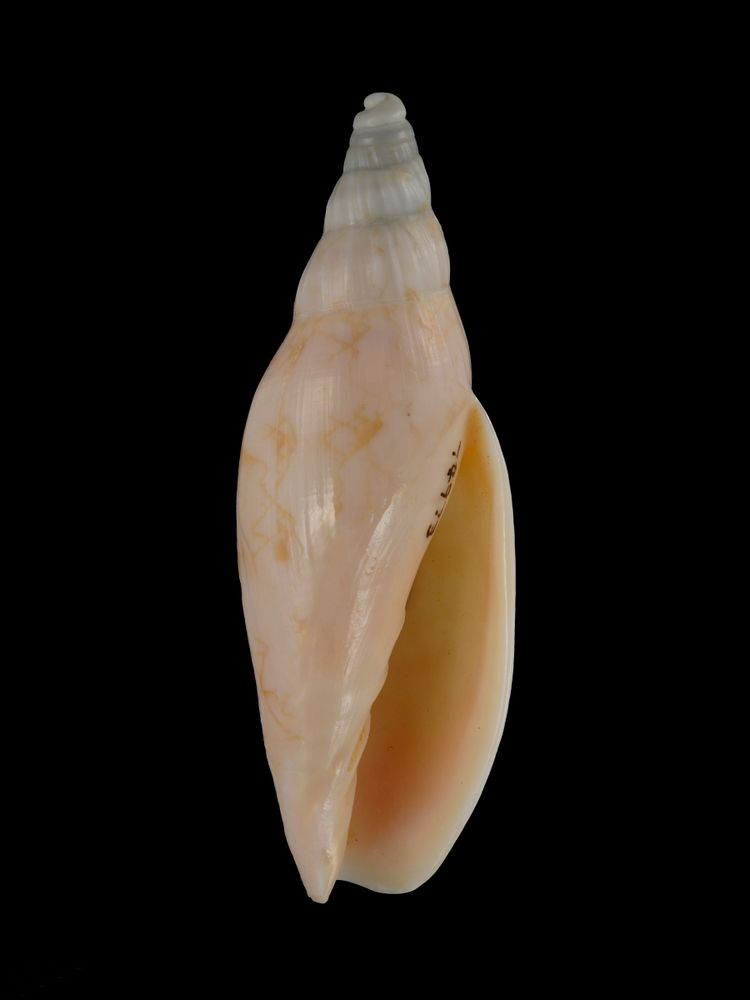
- Shell of Alcithoe triregensis (holotype at the Museum of New Zealand)

Scientific classification
- Kingdom: Animalia
- Phylum: Mollusca
- Class: Gastropoda
- Subclass: Caenogastropoda
- Order: Neogastropoda
- Family: Volutidae
- Genus: Alcithoe
- Species: A. triregensis

Binomial name
- Alcithoe triregensis Bail & Limpus 2005

= Alcithoe triregensis =

Species of gastropod

Alcithoe triregensis is a species of sea snail, a marine gastropod mollusk in the family Volutidae, the volutes.

== Description ==
The length of the shell attains 69.8 mm, its diameter 21.4 mm.

== Distribution ==
This marine species is endemic to New Zealand and occurs between the Middlesex Bank, northwest of Three Kings Islands at depths between 246 m and 291 m.
