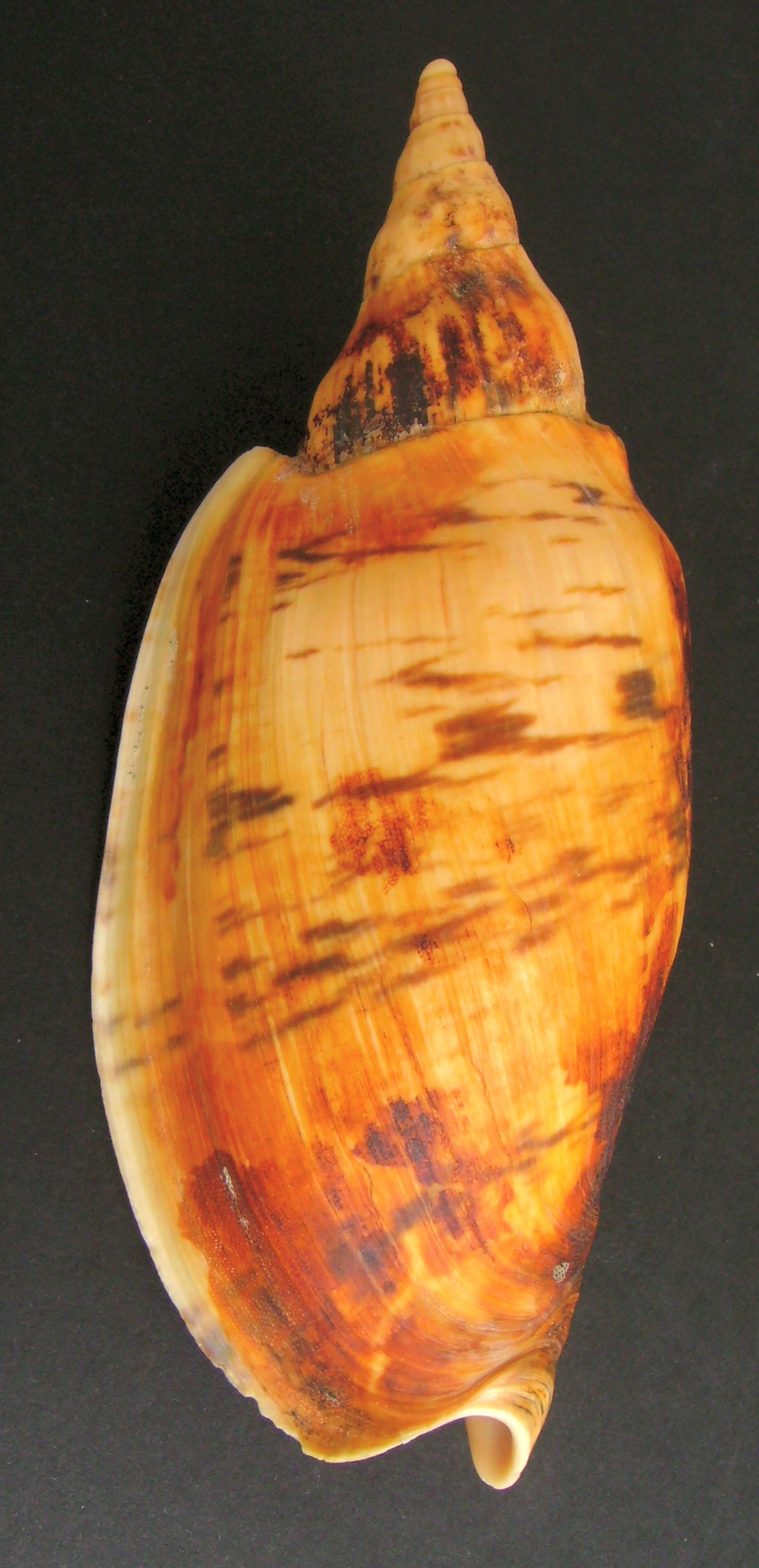
- Alcithoe arabica (smooth form)

Scientific classification
- Kingdom: Animalia
- Phylum: Mollusca
- Class: Gastropoda
- Subclass: Caenogastropoda
- Order: Neogastropoda
- Superfamily: Volutoidea
- Family: Volutidae
- Genus: Alcithoe; H. Adams & A. Adams, 1853

Type species
- Voluta pacifica Perry, 1810

Synonyms
- Alcithoe (Alcithoe) H. Adams & A. Adams, 1853 accepted, alternate representation; Alcithoe (Leporemax) Iredale, 1937; Fulgoraria (Alcithoe) H. Adams & A. Adams, 1853; Fulguraria (Alcithoe) H. Adams & A. Adams, 1853 (superseded combination); Gilvostia Iredale, 1937; Leporemax Iredale, 1937; Pachymelon (Palomelon) Finlay, 1926; Palomelon Finlay, 1926; Scaphella (Alcithoe) H. Adams & A. Adams, 1853 (superseded combination); Voluta (Alcithoe) H. Adams & A. Adams; Waihaoia (Palomelon) Finlay, 1926

= Alcithoe =

Genus of gastropods

Alcithoe is a genus of large sea snails, marine gastropod molluscs in the subfamily Cymbiinae of the family Volutidae, the volutes.

== Description ==
Alcithoe are large, benthic neogastropod marine snails. Species are predators, and all taxa undergo direct development.

The shell is ovately fusiform. The spire is produced. The apex is papillary. The aperture is ovate and wide. The inner lip shows a spreading callus. The outer lip is dilated and subreflexed.

== Distribution ==
Trawled at 20-30 fathoms. Alcithoe species are found in seas surrounding New Zealand. There is a rich fossil record for the genus.

== Species ==
Species within the genus Alcithoe include:

- Alcithoe aillaudorum(Ph. Bouchet & G. T. Poppe, 1988)
- Alcithoe albescens Bail & Limpus, 2005
- Alcithoe arabica (Gmelin, 1791)
- † Alcithoe arabicula Marwick, 1926
- † Alcithoe bacchanalia L. C. King, 1934
- † Alcithoe bartrumi L. C. King, 1933
- † Alcithoe bathgatei Finlay, 1926
- Alcithoe benthicola (Dell, 1963)
- † Alcithoe brevis Marwick, 1926
- † Alcithoe bulbus (Marwick, 1931)
- † Alcithoe callaghani (L. C. King, 1931)
- Alcithoe colesae Bail & Limpus, 2005
- † Alcithoe concisa Marwick, 1931
- † Alcithoe cylindrica Marwick, 1926
- Alcithoe davegibbsi (Hart, 1999)
- † Alcithoe dilatata Marwick, 1926
- † Alcithoe dyscrita Finlay, 1926
- † Alcithoe exigua Marwick, 1926
- † Alcithoe familiaris Marwick, 1926
- † Alcithoe finlayi Marwick, 1926
- † Alcithoe firma (Marwick, 1926)
- Alcithoe fissurata (Dell, 1963)
- Alcithoe flemingi Dell, 1978
- Alcithoe fusus (Quoy & Gaimard, 1833)
- † Alcithoe gatesi Marwick, 1926
- † Alcithoe gravicostata L. C. King, 1931
- † Alcithoe haweraensis Marwick, 1926
- † Alcithoe hurupiensis Marwick, 1926
- † Alcithoe irregularis Marwick, 1926
- Alcithoe jaculoides Powell, 1924 - synonym: Alcithoe calva Powell, 1928
- Alcithoe larochei Marwick, 1926
- † Alcithoe lepida Marwick, 1926
- Alcithoe lutea (Watson, 1882)
- † Alcithoe marlburiana L. C. King, 1934
- † Alcithoe murdochi (Marwick, 1926)
- † Alcithoe nodulifera Laws, 1935
- † Alcithoe parva Marwick, 1926
- † Alcithoe phymatias Finlay, 1926
- † Alcithoe pinguella (Marwick, 1931)
- † Alcithoe powelli (Laws, 1936)
- Alcithoe pseudolutea Bail & Limpus, 2005
- † Alcithoe regularis Finlay, 1926
- † Alcithoe renwicki (Marwick, 1928)
- † Alcithoe resolutionis C. A. Fleming, 1954
- † Alcithoe rugosa (Marwick, 1926)
- † Alcithoe scitula Marwick, 1926
- † Alcithoe scopi Marwick, 1926
- Alcithoe seelyeorum Bail & Limpus, 2005
- † Alcithoe solida Marwick, 1926
- Alcithoe tigrina Bail & Limpus, 2005
- Alcithoe triregensis Bail & Limpus, 2005
- † Alcithoe turrita (Suter, 1917)
- † Alcithoe uptonensis L. C. King, 1934
- †Alcithoe wangaloaensis Stilwell, 2016
- † Alcithoe whakinoensis Marwick, 1926
- Alcithoe wilsonae (Powell, 1933)

== Synonyms ==
- † Alcithoe acuta Marwick, 1926: synonym of Alcithoe arabica (Gmelin, 1791) (junior subjective synonym)
- † Alcithoe amundseni Stilwell & Zinsmeister, 1992: synonym of † Odontocymbiola amundseni (Stilwell & Zinsmeister, 1992) † (superseded combination)
- † Alcithoe armigera Marwick, 1926: synonym of † Alcithoe cylindrica Marwick, 1926 (junior subjective synonym)
- Alcithoe calva Powell, 1928: synonym of Alcithoe jaculoides Powell, 1924
- Alcithoe chathamensis (Dell, 1956): synonym of Alcithoe wilsonae (Powell, 1933)
- † Alcithoe compressa Marwick, 1926 † synonym of † Alcithoe cylindrica Marwick, 1926 (junior subjective synonym)
- † Alcithoe detrita Marwick, 1926: synonym of Alcithoe arabica (Gmelin, 1791) (junior subjective synonym)
- Alcithoe grahami (Powell, 1965): synonym of Alcithoe wilsonae (Powell, 1933)
- Alcithoe haurakiensis Dell, 1956: synonym of Alcithoe fusus (Quoy & Gaimard, 1833)
- Alcithoe hedleyi (Murdoch & Suter, 1906): synonym of Alcithoe fusus (Quoy & Gaimard, 1833)
- Alcithoe johnstoni Powell, 1928: synonym of Alcithoe jaculoides Powell, 1924
- Alcithoe knoxi (Dell, 1956): synonym of Alcithoe wilsonae (Powell, 1933)
- † Alcithoe lutea Marwick, 1924: synonym of Alcithoe arabica (Gmelin, 1791) (junior secondary homonym and synonym)
- † Alcithoe mackayi Marwick, 1926: synonym of Alcithoe brevis Marwick, 1926 (junior subjective synonym)
- Alcithoe motutaraensis Powell, 1928: synonym of Alcithoe arabica (Gmelin, 1791)
- † Alcithoe oliveri Marwick, 1926: synonym of Mauira oliveri (Marwick, 1926)
- Alcithoe ostenfeldi (Iredale, 1937): synonym of Alcithoe larochei ostenfeldi (Iredale, 1937)
- Alcithoe pacifica (Perry, 1810): synonym of Alcithoe arabica (Gmelin, 1791)
- Alcithoe swainsoni Marwick, 1926: synonym of Alcithoe arabica (Gmelin, 1791)
  - Alcithoe swainsoni motutarensis Powell, 1928: synonym of Alcithoe arabica (Gmelin, 1791)
