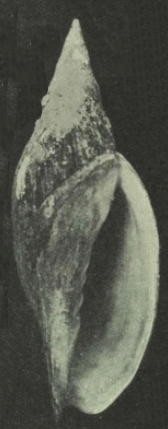
- Shell of Alcithoe jaculoides (holotype)

Scientific classification
- Kingdom: Animalia
- Phylum: Mollusca
- Class: Gastropoda
- Subclass: Caenogastropoda
- Order: Neogastropoda
- Family: Volutidae
- Genus: Alcithoe
- Species: A. jaculoides

Binomial name
- Alcithoe jaculoides Powell, 1924

Synonyms
- Alcithoe arabica jaculoides A. W. B. Powell, 1924 (superseded combination); Alcithoe calva A. W. B. Powell, 1924; Alcithoe johnstoni A. W. B. Powell, 1924

= Alcithoe jaculoides =

Species of gastropod

Alcithoe jaculoides is a species of large sea snail, a marine gastropod mollusc in the family Volutidae, the volutes.

== Description ==
The length of the shell attains 188 mm, its diameter 70 mm.

(Described as Alcithoe calva) The shell is very large, narrow, and elongated, comprising 8½ whorls. The protoconch has a scaphelloid shape. It is moderately large, consisting of 2½ smooth whorls. The remaining whorls are smooth and devoid of sculpture, except in rare instances where the spire whorls are faintly shouldered, showing traces of axial ribs.

The spire is tall with slightly convex whorls. It measures approximately half the height of the aperture, The body whorl is elongate and sub-cylindrical, gradually contracted below to a rounded fasciole, not marked off by the usual ridge. The aperture is long and rather narrow with a shallow notch below. The outer lip is thickened and reflexed above, ascending about one-third the height of the penultimate whorl. The columella is straight, tapering to a sharp point below, with six comparatively weak, very oblique plications; the uppermost being more or less rudimentary. There is no projecting callus plate. The inner lip is spread as a thin glaze broadly over the body whorl.

The color of the shell is pale buff, ornamented with indistinct, irregular light brown zigzag lines. The interior of the aperture is pinkish-fawn.

== Distribution ==
This species is found only along the coast of North Island, New Zealand.

== Sources ==
- Powell, A.W.B. (1924). "Description of a new subspecies of Alcithoe arabica Martyn, from New Zealand". Proceedings of the Malacological Society of London. 16: 108–109.
- Spencer, H.G., Marshall, B.A. & Willan, R.C. (2009). Checklist of New Zealand living Mollusca. Pp 196-219. in: Gordon, D.P. (ed.) New Zealand inventory of biodiversity. Volume one. Kingdom Animalia: Radiata, Lophotrochozoa, Deuterostomia. Christchurch: Canterbury University Press.
- ., Trewick S.A. & Morgan-Richards M (2011). "Phylogenetic information of genes, illustrated with mitochondrial data from a genus of gastropod molluscs". Biological Journal of the Linnean Society. 104 (4): 770–785. doi:10.1111/j.1095-8312.2011.01756.x.
- Bail, P., Limpus, A. (2005). Conchological Iconography 11, The Recent Volutes of New Zealand, with a revision of the genus Alcithoe H. & A. Adams, 1853. Hackenheim, Germany: ConchBooks.
