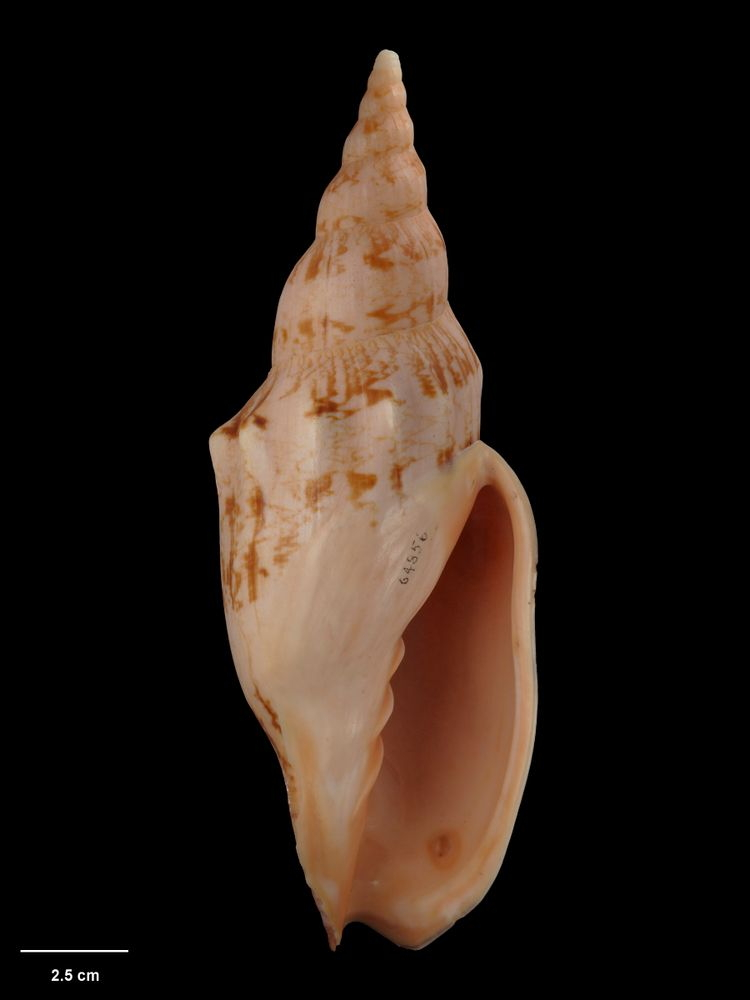
- Shell of Alcithoe seelyeorum(holotype at the Museum of New Zealand)

Scientific classification
- Kingdom: Animalia
- Phylum: Mollusca
- Class: Gastropoda
- Subclass: Caenogastropoda
- Order: Neogastropoda
- Family: Volutidae
- Genus: Alcithoe
- Species: A. seelyeorum

Binomial name
- Alcithoe seelyeorum Bail & Limpus, 2005

= Alcithoe seelyeorum =

Species of gastropod

Alcithoe seelyeorum is a species of sea snail, a marine gastropod mollusk in the family Volutidae, the volutes.

== Description ==
The length of the shell attains 190 mm, its diameter is 75 mm.

== Distribution ==
This marine species is endemic to New Zealand and occurs between Three Kings Islands and North Cape.
