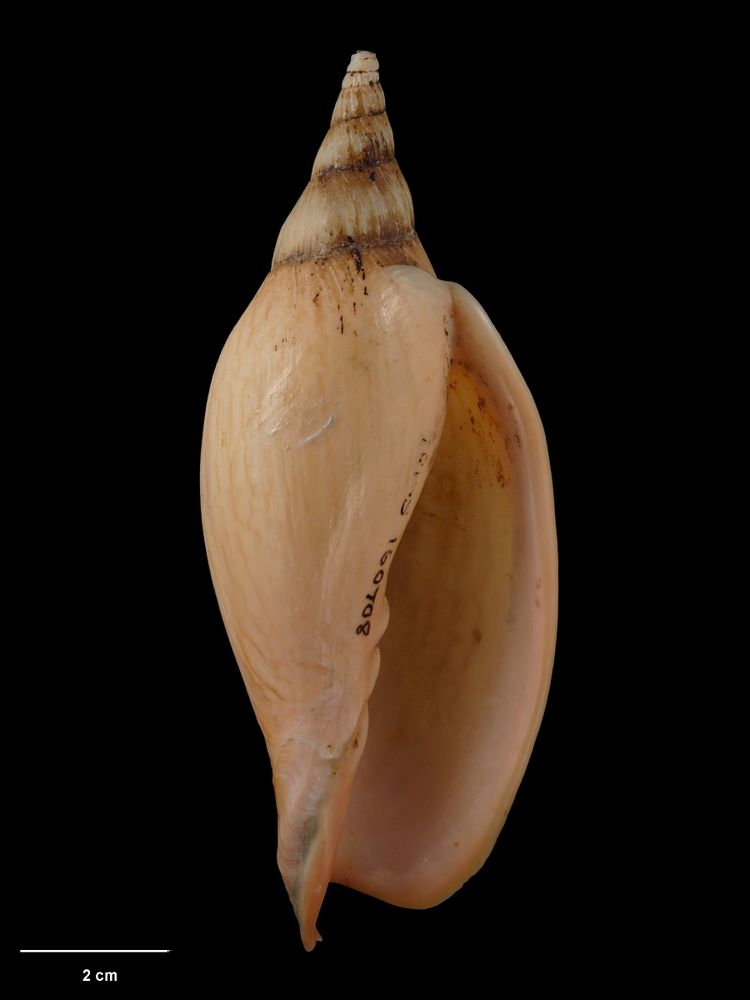
- Shell of Alcithoe tigrina (holotype at the Museum of New Zealand)

Scientific classification
- Kingdom: Animalia
- Phylum: Mollusca
- Class: Gastropoda
- Subclass: Caenogastropoda
- Order: Neogastropoda
- Family: Volutidae
- Genus: Alcithoe
- Species: A. tigrina

Binomial name
- Alcithoe tigrina Bail & Limpus 2005

Synonyms
- Alcithoe larochei tigrina Bail & Limpus, 2005 (superseded combination)

= Alcithoe tigrina =

Species of gastropod

Alcithoe tigrina is a species of sea snail, a marine gastropod mollusk in the family Volutidae, the volutes.

== Description ==
The length of the shell attains 140 mm, its diameter 64 mm.

== Distribution ==
This marine species is endemic to New Zealand and occurs from the Bay of Plenty to Mahia.
