= Tasmalira vitrea =

Scientific classification
- Kingdom: Animalia
- Phylum: Mollusca
- Class: Gastropoda
- Subclass: Caenogastropoda
- Order: incertae sedis
- Family: Cerithiidae
- Genus: Tasmalira
- Species: T. vitrea

Binomial name
- Tasmalira vitrea (Suter, 1908)

Synonyms
- Bittium vitreum Suter, 1908; Tasmalira wellingtonensis Dell,1956

Species of gastropod

Tasmalira vitrea is a species of small sea snail, a marine gastropod mollusc in the family Cerithiidae, the cerithiids.
