= Tractolira germonae =

Scientific classification
- Kingdom: Animalia
- Phylum: Mollusca
- Class: Gastropoda
- Subclass: Caenogastropoda
- Order: Neogastropoda
- Family: Volutidae
- Genus: Tractolira
- Species: T. germonae

Binomial name
- Tractolira germonae Harasewych, 1987

Species of gastropod

Tractolira germonae is a species of sea snail, a marine gastropod mollusk in the family Volutidae, the volutes.
