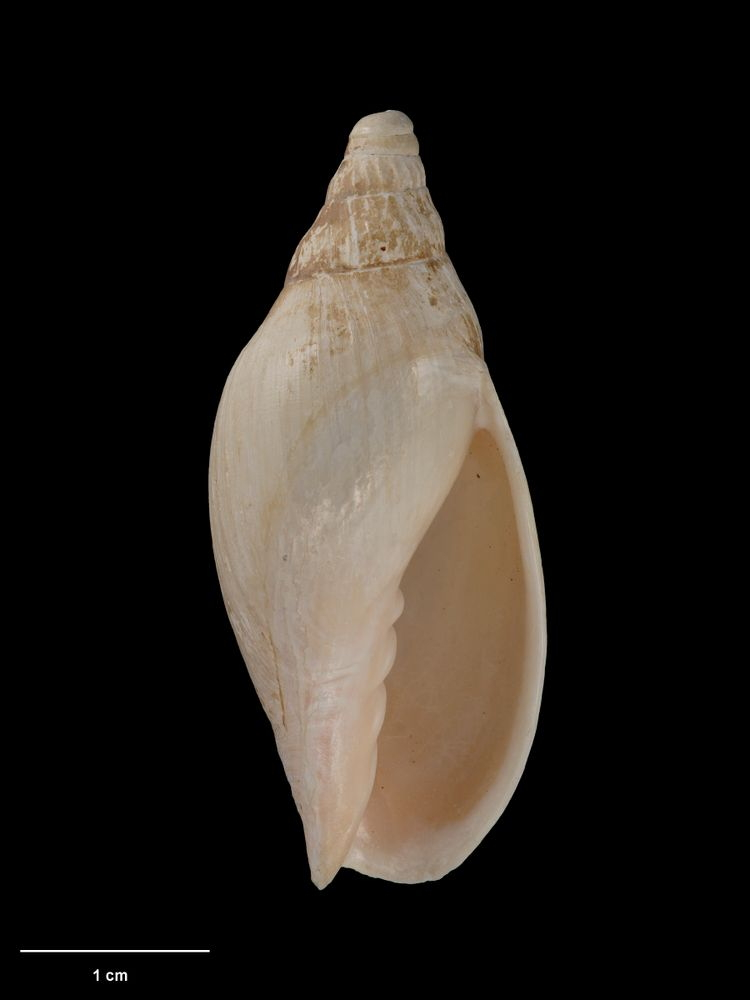
- Shell of Alcithoe albescens (holotype in the Museum of New Zealand)

Scientific classification
- Kingdom: Animalia
- Phylum: Mollusca
- Class: Gastropoda
- Subclass: Caenogastropoda
- Order: Neogastropoda
- Family: Volutidae
- Genus: Alcithoe
- Species: A. albescens

Binomial name
- Alcithoe albescens Bail & Limpus 2005

= Alcithoe albescens =

Species of gastropod

Alcithoe albescens is a species of sea snail, a marine gastropod mollusk in the family Volutidae, the volutes.

== Description ==
The length of the shell attains 48 mm, its diameter 21 mm.

== Distribution ==
This marine species is endemic to New Zealand and occurs off Northland at a depth of 400 m to 450 mm.
