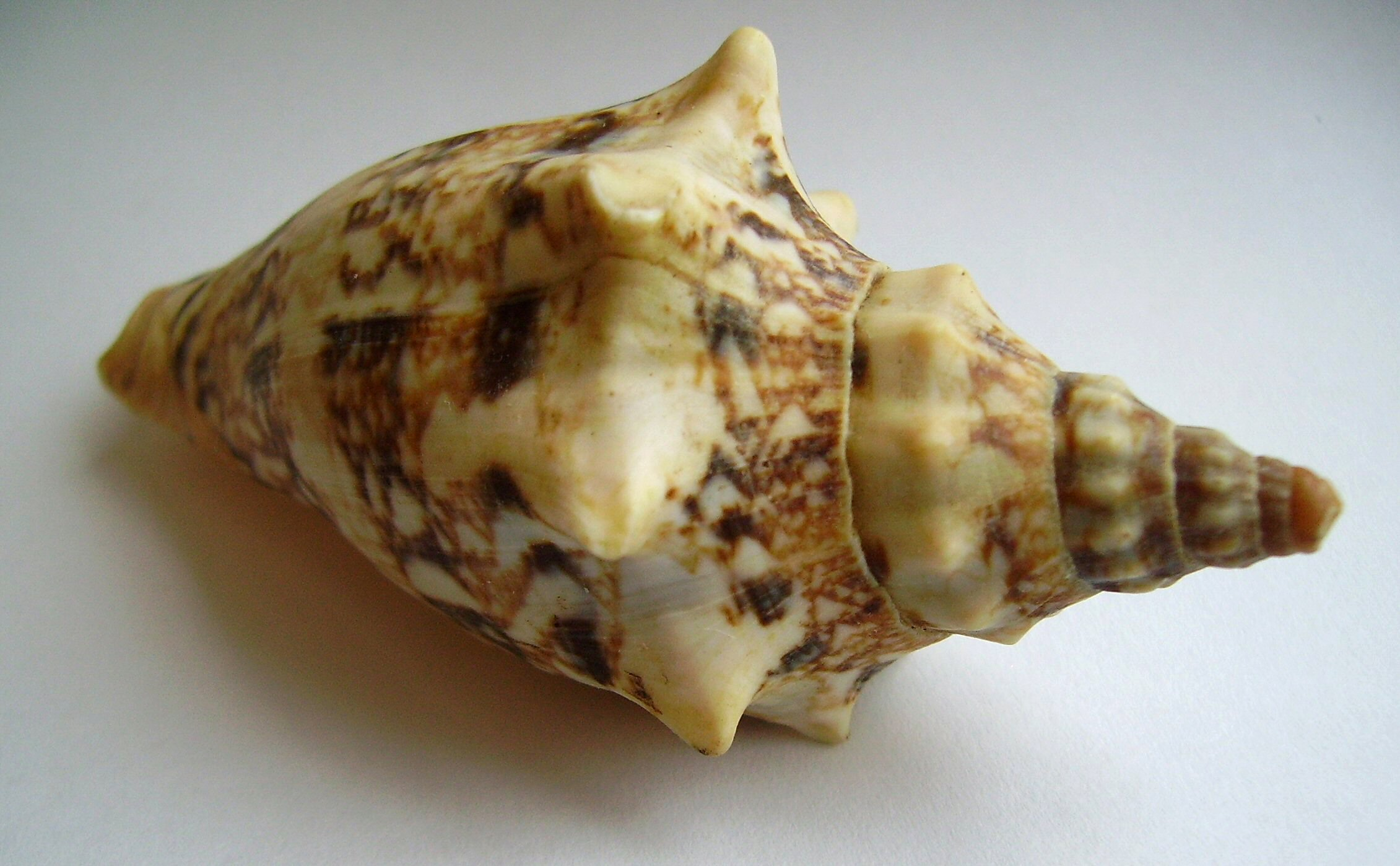
- A shell of the shouldered form of Alcithoe arabica

Scientific classification
- Kingdom: Animalia
- Phylum: Mollusca
- Class: Gastropoda
- Subclass: Caenogastropoda
- Order: Neogastropoda
- Family: Volutidae
- Genus: Alcithoe
- Species: A. arabica

Binomial name
- Alcithoe arabica (Gmelin, 1791)
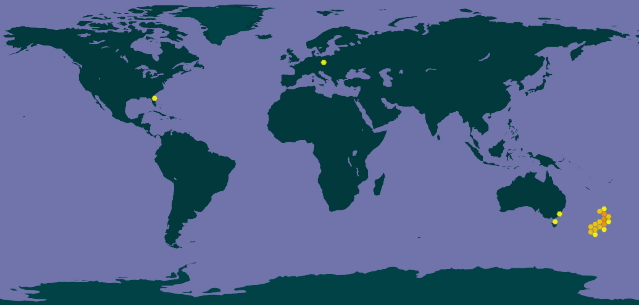

Synonyms
- See list

= Alcithoe arabica =

Species of gastropod

Alcithoe arabica, common name Arabic volute, is a species of very large sea snail, a marine gastropod mollusc in the family Volutidae, the volutes.

== Distribution ==
This species is endemic to New Zealand.

== Description ==
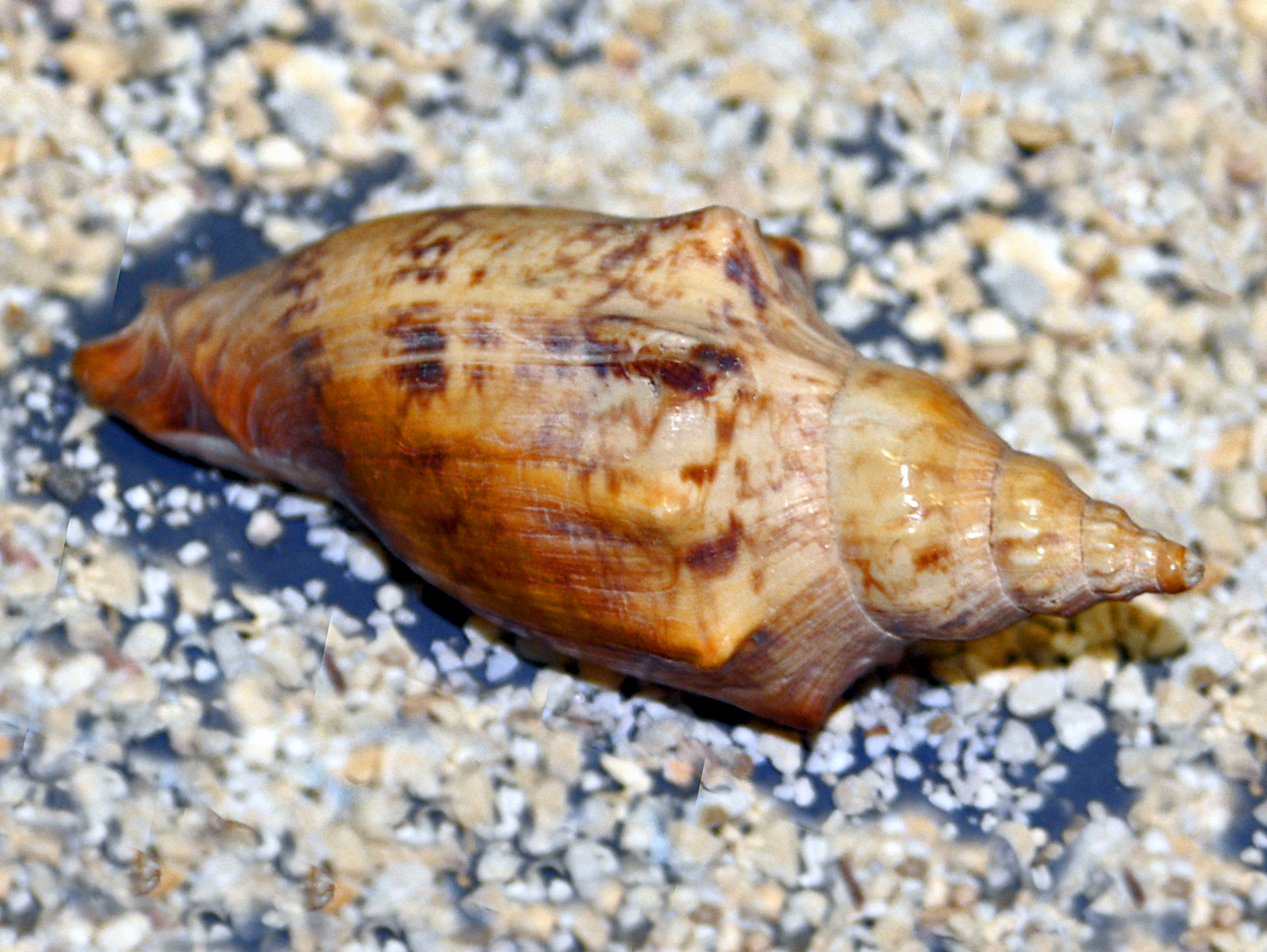
A shell of Alcithoe arabica

Shells of Alcithoe arabica can reach a height of 75–225 millimetres (3.0–8.9 in) and a width of 88 mm. These shells are usually large, solid, fusiform, with relatively weak tubercles on the shoulder of the body whorl. The shell aperture is high with a thickened, rounded outer lip. The external surface is yellowish-white with chestnut zig-zag markings, forming five bands on the body whorl. These markings were thought to resemble Arabic writing, giving rise to the name of the species.

There is no operculum in A. arabica. Individuals have a large grey to brown foot, flecked with purple and orange markings.

== Ecology ==
These sea snails live in subtidal waters on soft sediments. Alcithoe arabica are able to move quite quickly on the soft substrate. They feed on bivalves that they smother using their large foot. The rounded, thin shelled eggs of this species are laid on stones or other shells.

== Subspecies ==
- Alcithoe arabica jaculoides A. W. B. Powell, 1924 : synonym of Alcithoe jaculoides A. W. B. Powell, 1924 (superseded combination)

== Synonyms ==
- Alcithoe (Alcithoe) arabica (Gmelin, 1791) (superseded combination)
- Alcithoe (Alcithoe) swainsoni Marwick, 1926 (junior subjective synonym)
- † Alcithoe acuta Marwick, 1926 (junior subjective synonym)
- † Alcithoe detrita Marwick, 1926 (junior subjective synonym)
- † Alcithoe lutea Marwick, 1924 (junior secondary homonym and synonym)
- Alcithoe motutarensis A. W. B. Powell, 1928 (junior subjective synonym)
- † Alcithoe nukumaruensis (P. Marshall & Murdoch, 1920) (junior subjective synonym)
- Alcithoe swainsoni Marwick, 1926
- Alcithoe motutaraensis Powell A. W. B., 1928
- † Alcithoe transformis Marwick, 1926 (junior subjective synonym)
- † Fulgoraria (Alcithoe) arabica (Gmelin, 1791) (superseded combination)
- Fulgoraraia (Alcithoe) depressa Suter, 1908
- Fulgoraria arabica (Gmelin, 1791) (superseded combination)
- † Fulgoraria turrita var. nukumaruensis P. Marshall & Murdoch, 1920 (junior subjective synonym)
- Fulguraria (Alcithoe) arabica (Gmelin, 1791) (superseded combination)
- Fulguraria (Alcithoe) depressa Suter, 1908 (junior subjective synonym)
- † Fulguraria (Alcithoe) turrita var. nukumaruensis P. Marshall & Murdoch, 1920 (junior subjective synonym)
- Notovoluta rossiteri Brazier, 1898
- Notovoluta rossiteri Swainson, 1821
- Notovoluta rossiteri Perry, 1810
- Voluta arabica Gmelin, 1791 (superseded combination)
- Voluta elongata Swainson, 1821 (junior subjective synonym)
- Voluta pacifica Perry, 1810 (junior subjective synonym)
- Voluta rossiteri Brazier, 1898 (junior subjective synonym)

== Gallery ==
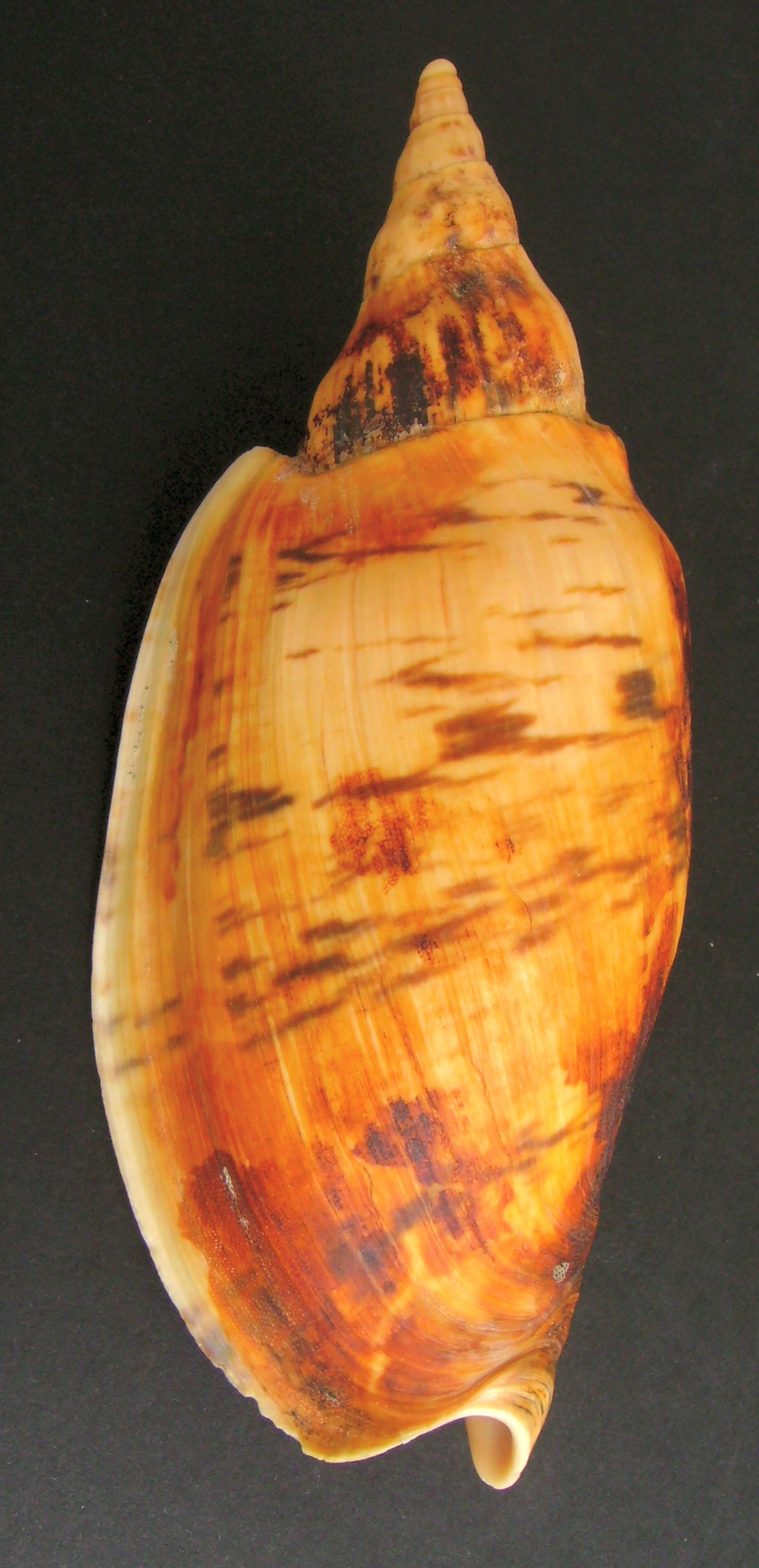
A shell of Alcithoe arabica (smooth form)

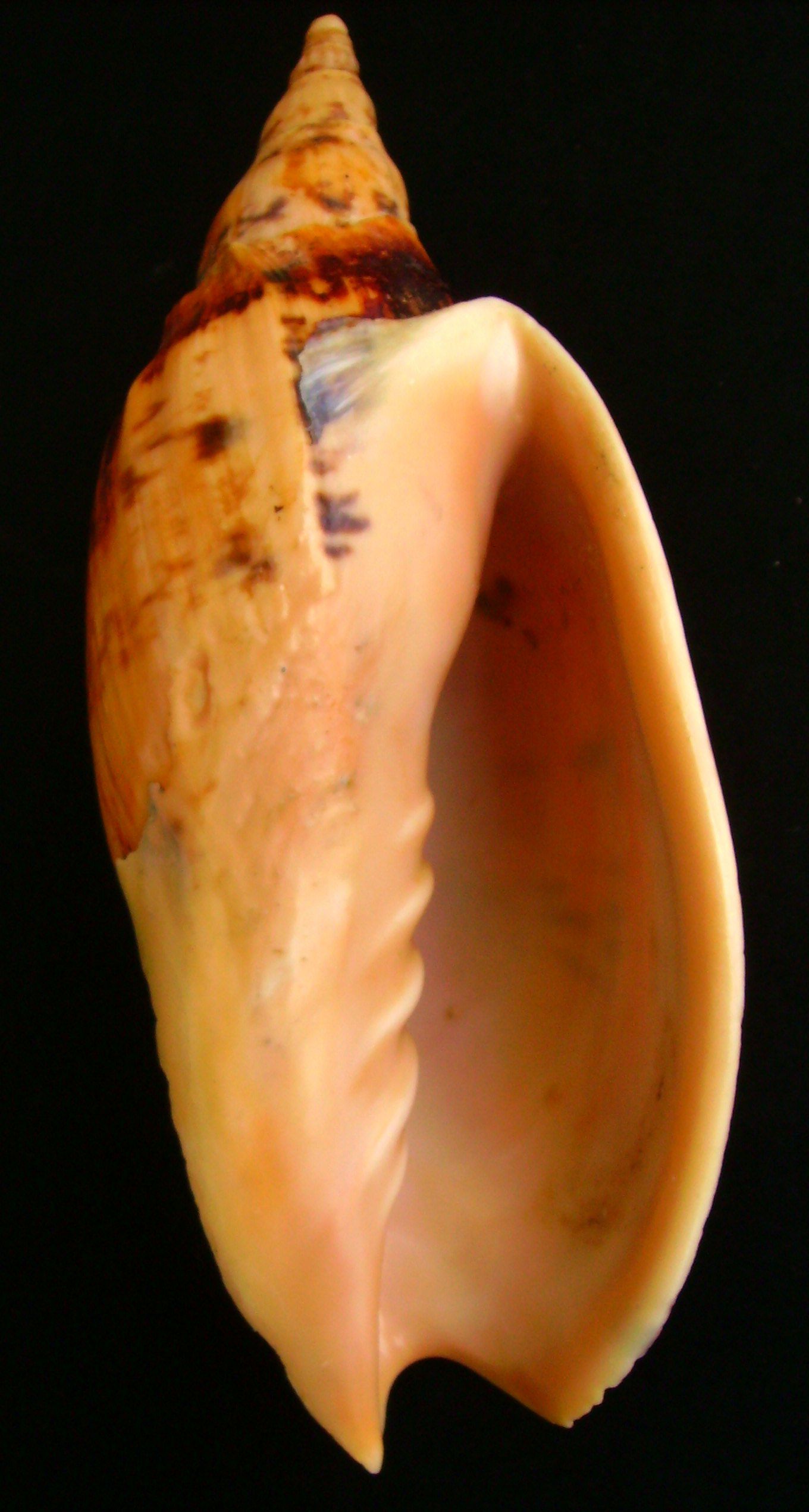
Apertural view
