= Tasmalira =

Scientific classification
- Kingdom: Animalia
- Phylum: Mollusca
- Class: Gastropoda
- Subclass: Caenogastropoda
- Order: incertae sedis
- Family: Cerithiidae
- Genus: Tasmalira; Dell, 1956

Species
- See text

Genus of gastropods

Tasmalira is a genus of very small sea snails, marine gastropod molluscs in the family Cerithiidae, the cerithids.

== Species ==
Species within the genus Tasmalira include:

- Tasmalira vitrea (Suter, 1908)

Species brought into synonymy

- Tasmalira wellingtonensis Dell, 1956: synonym of Tasmalira vitrea (Suter, 1908)
