= Tractolira =

Scientific classification
- Kingdom: Animalia
- Phylum: Mollusca
- Class: Gastropoda
- Subclass: Caenogastropoda
- Order: Neogastropoda
- Family: Volutidae
- Subfamily: Cymbiinae
- Genus: Tractolira; Dall, 1896

Genus of gastropods

Tractolira is a genus of sea snails, marine gastropod mollusks in the family Volutidae.

== Species ==
Species within the genus Tractolira include:

- Tractolira delli Leal & Harasewych, 2005
- Tractolira germonae Harasewych, 1987
- Tractolira sparta Dall, 1896
- Tractolira tenebrosa Leal & Bouchet, 1985
