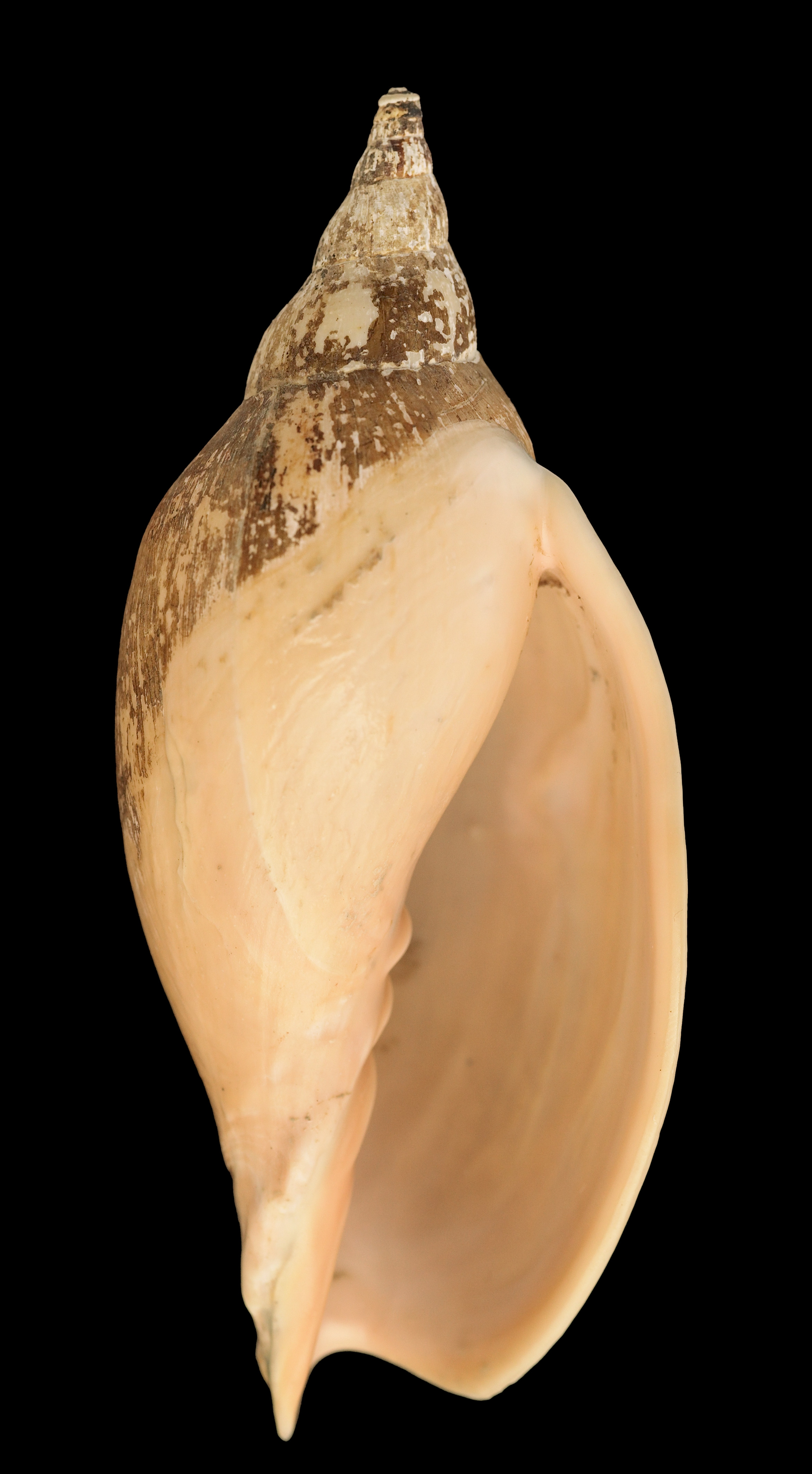
- Shell of Alcithoe larochei (specimen at the Museum of New Zealand)

Conservation status
- Not Threatened (NZ TCS)

Scientific classification
- Kingdom: Animalia
- Phylum: Mollusca
- Class: Gastropoda
- Subclass: Caenogastropoda
- Order: Neogastropoda
- Family: Volutidae
- Genus: Alcithoe
- Species: A. larochei

Binomial name
- Alcithoe larochei Marwick, 1926

= Alcithoe larochei =

Species of gastropod

Alcithoe larochei is a species of large deepwater sea snail, a marine gastropod mollusc in the family Volutidae, the volutes.

== Description ==
The length of the shell attains 144 mm, its diameter is 66 mm.

== Distribution ==
This marine species is endemic to New Zealand and occurs off North Island: Bay of Plenty to Cape Campbell and Cook Strait.
