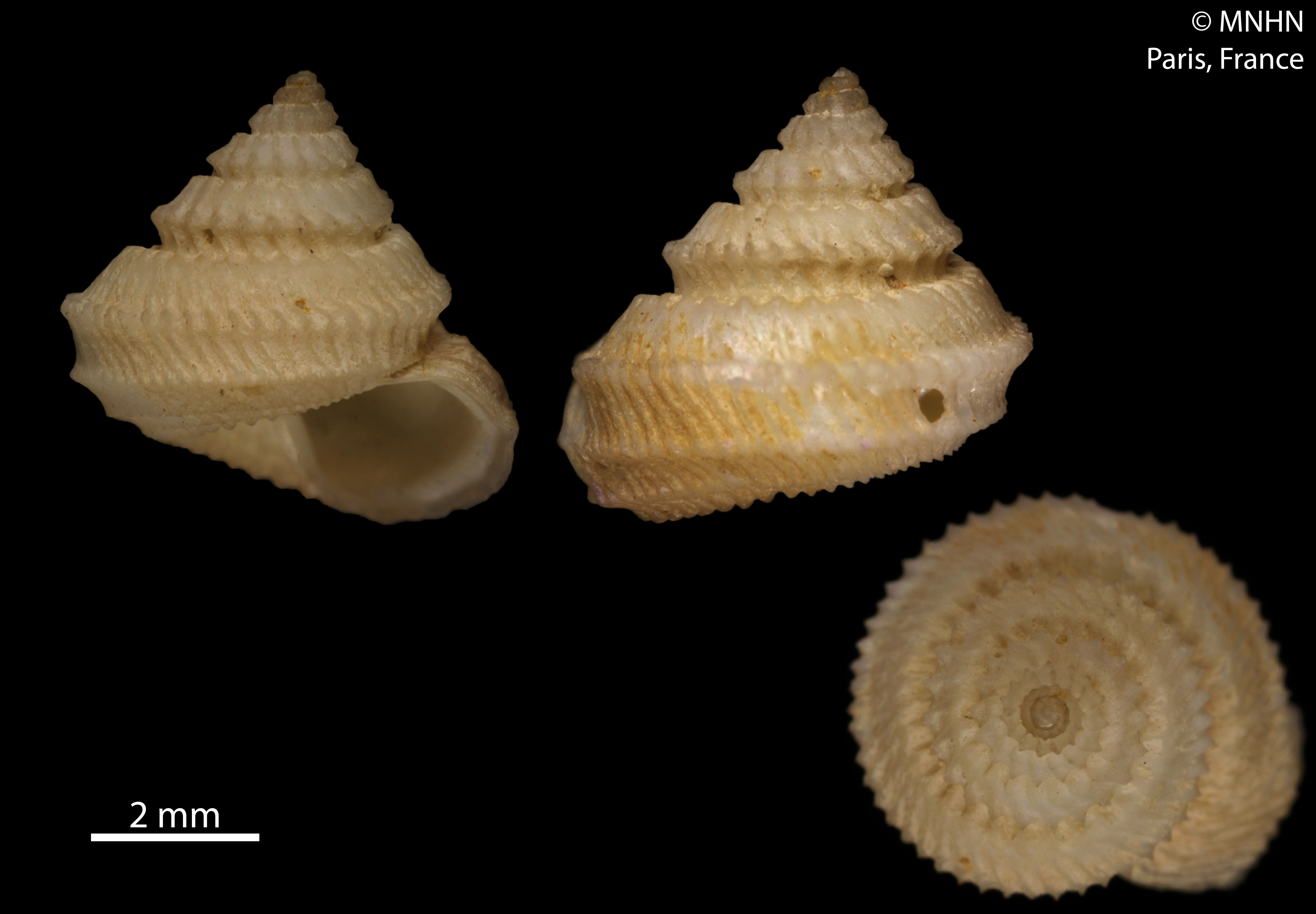
- Shell of Calliotropis delli (specimen at MNHN, Paris)

Scientific classification
- Kingdom: Animalia
- Phylum: Mollusca
- Class: Gastropoda
- Subclass: Vetigastropoda
- Family: Calliotropidae
- Genus: Calliotropis
- Species: C. delli

Binomial name
- Calliotropis delli Marshall, 1979

Synonyms
- Calliotropis (Calliotropis) delli Marshall, 1979

= Calliotropis delli =

Species of gastropod

Calliotropis delli is a species of sea snail, a marine gastropod mollusk in the family Eucyclidae.

== Description ==
The shell reaches a length of 4.8 mm.

== Distribution ==
This marine species occurs off the Kermadec Islands and New Caledonia.
