= Richard Dell =

New Zealand zoologist and malacologist (1920–2002)

Richard Dell QSO
- Born: Richard Kenneth Dell; 11 July 1920; Auckland, New Zealand
- Died: 6 March 2002 (aged 81); Wellington, New Zealand
- Education: Victoria University College
- Known for: Work on molluscs of the Chatham Islands and the Antarctic
- Spouse: Miriam Matthews (m. 1946)
- Children: 4
- Scientific career
- Fields: Malacology
- Workplaces: Museum of New Zealand Te Papa Tongarewa

Richard Kenneth Dell QSO (11 July 1920 – 6 March 2002) was a New Zealand malacologist.

== Biography ==
Dell was born in Auckland in 1920. As a young boy, he took an interest in shells, collecting them from the shores of Waitematā Harbour. He even managed to start a "museum" in his backyard. He also helped curate the Auckland War Memorial Museum shell collection.

Dell studied at Mount Albert Grammar School and later at the Auckland University College. He took a teacher’s course at Auckland Teachers' College, but World War II delayed his plans to become a teacher. He joined the New Zealand Artillery, serving on Nissan Island, the Solomon Islands, Southwest Asia, Egypt, and Italy. He later published several papers on the land snails he had collected in the Solomon Islands.

In 1946, he married botanist and schoolteacher Miriam Matthews, and they had four daughters together. His wife continued working after their marriage and became a well-known women's advocate.

After the war, Dell was offered a job as malacologist at the Dominion Museum, where he started to standardise the cabinets and built up a collection of more than 30,000 specimens. In the meantime, he took a master's degree in Science at Victoria University College, with a pioneering thesis on cephalopods, octopuses and squid. Dell was one of the zoologists studying invertebrates on the 1949 New Zealand American Fiordland Expedition.

His breakthrough came with the 1954 Chatham Islands expedition. The results were published in 1956 as The Archibenthal Mollusca of New Zealand, which was a major contribution to the knowledge of molluscan fauna in the bathyal zone of New Zealand waters. This publication earned him a Doctorate in Science in 1956.

Soon after, Dell started to work on Antarctic collections, with among others Alan Beu and Winston Ponder. In 1964, he published a major monograph on the Antarctic bivalves, chitons and scaphopods.

In 1965 Dell was a participant in the Royal Society Expedition to the British Solomon Islands Protectorate.

Dell became first Assistant Director in 1961 and later in 1966, Director of the Dominion Museum, which would become the Museum of New Zealand Te Papa Tongarewa. He retired in 1980, and started writing again. In 1990, he published his standard work Antarctic Mollusca with special reference to the Fauna of the Ross Sea. Dell published more than 150 papers on Mollusca (marine, terrestrial and freshwater), crabs and birds. He also made a major contribution to the Antarctic biogeography.

== Honours and awards ==
In the 1981 New Year Honours, Dell was appointed a Companion of the Queen's Service Order for public services. In 1977, he was awarded the Queen Elizabeth II Silver Jubilee Medal, and in 1990 he received the New Zealand 1990 Commemoration Medal. He was an honoured member of many scientific societies and committees. He won prizes and medals in New Zealand and abroad, including the Hamilton Prize in 1955, and the Hector Medal in 1965, both awarded by the Royal Society of New Zealand. He has named many new species of molluscs and several new crustaceans.

== Death ==
Dell died in 2002, after a long illness, in Wellington. He was survived by his wife, Dame Miriam Dell, and their four daughters.

== Selected publications ==
In scientific journals

- Dell, R.K. (1950) A Tertiary molluscan fauna from Waikowhai, Manukau Harbour, Auckland. Dominion Museum Records in Zoology, 1, 29–37.
- Dell, R.K. (1952) A revision of the molluscan fauna of the Hurupi beds, southern Wairarapa. Dominion Museum Records in Zoology, 1, 71–86.
- Dell, R.K. (1953) A molluscan fauna from the Chatham Rise, New Zealand. Dominion Museum Records in Zoology, 2, 37–50.
- Dell, R.K. (1955) Nature in New Zealand Native Shells. A.H. & A.W. Reed, Wellington, 64 pp.
- Dell, R.K. (1956) The archibenthal Mollusca of New Zealand. Dominion Museum Bulletin, 18, 1–235.
- Dell, R.K. (1956) Some new off-shore Mollusca from New Zealand. Dominion Museum Records in Zoology, 3, 27–59.
- Dell, R.K. (1962) Additional archibenthal Mollusca from New Zealand. Dominion Museum Records in Zoology, 4, 67–76.
- Dell, R.K. (1963) Notes on some New Zealand Mollusca in the British Museum. Transactions of the Royal Society of New Zealand, Zoology, 3, 171–177.
- Dell, R.K. (1963) Archibenthal Mollusca from northern New Zealand. Transactions of the Royal Society of New Zealand, Zoology, 3, 205–216.
- Dell, R.K. (1972) Notes on nomenclature of some Mollusca from Antarctica and southern South America. Records of the Dominion Museum, 8, 21–42.
- Dell, R.K. (1990) Antarctic Mollusca with special reference to the fauna of the Ross Sea. The Royal Society of New Zealand Bulletin, 27, 1–311.

Other publications

- The New Zealand Cephalopoda (1952)
- The fresh-water Mollusca of New Zealand, 3 parts (1953–1956)
- The position of systematics in the biological sciences (1953)
- Cephalopoda (1959)
- Antarctic and Subantarctic Mollusca, Bivalvia, Amphineura and Scaphopoda (1964)

== Taxa named by R.K. Dell ==
Apart from having named numerous species in the Mollusca and some in the Crustacea, he has also established a number of new genera :

- Alertalex Dell, 1956 (Calliostomatidae)
- Antarctodomus Dell, 1972 (Buccinidae)
- Benthomodiolus Dell, 1987 (Mytilidae )
- Cavellioropa Dell, 1952 (Charopidae)
- Chathamidia Dell, 1956 : synonym of Exilia Conrad, 1860 (Ptychatractidae)
- Falsitromina Dell, 1990 (Buccinidae)
- Flammoconcha Dell, 1952 (Charopidae)
- Maoriconcha Dell, 1952 (Charopidae)
- Maoricrater Dell, 1956 (Lepetidae)
- Maoriscaphander Dell, 1950 (Cylichnidae)
- Obanella Dell, 1952 (Charopidae)
- Pseudegestula Dell, 1954 (Charopidae)
- family Rhizoridae Dell, 1952 (superfamily Philinoidea) [originally regarded as a synonym of Retusidae by Bouchet & Rocroi (2005) but reinstated as valid by Malaquias et al. (2009) ]
- Rissopsetia Dell, 1956 (Pyramidellidae)
- Ruapukea Dell, 1952 (Aclididae)
- Tasmalira Dell, 1956 (Cerithiopsidae)
- Tasmocrossea Dell, 1952 (Skeneidae)
- Tecticrater Dell, 1956 (Lepetellidae)
- (Crustacea) Pteropeltarion Dell, 1972 (Trichopeltariidae)

== Taxa named in honour of R.K. Dell ==
- The Sea Snail Brookula delli Numanami, 1996
- The Sa Snail Calliotropis delli Marshall, 1979
- Carditella delli Crozier, 1966
- Cuspidaria delli Knudsen, 1970
- Cyclochlamys delli Dijkstra & Marshall, 2008
- Cymonomus delli Griffin & Brown, 1975
- The fish Genus Dellichthys Briggs, 1955
- The Sea Snail Eatoniella delli Ponder, 1965
- Gasparia delli (Forster, 1955)
- Limatula delli Fleming, 1978
- Neilo delli B.A. Marshall, 1978
- Nereis delli Knox, 1960
- Nuculana delliana Huber, 2010
- Ogyrides delli Yaldwyn, 1971
- The Sea Snail Otukaia delli McLean & Andrade, 1982
- The Sea Snail Penion benthicolus delli Powell, 1971
- Platypodia delli Takeda & Webber, 2006
- Podocatactes delli (Guinot, 1989) (basionym: Trachycarcinus delli Guinot, 1989)
- The Sea Snail Tractolira delli Leal & Harasewych, 2005
- The Sea Snail Zeacolpus delli Marwick, 1957 : synonym of Stiracolpus pagoda (Reeve, 1849)

== Sources ==
- Tucker, J.K. 2004 Catalog of recent and fossil turrids (Mollusca: Gastropoda). Zootaxa 682:1-1295
