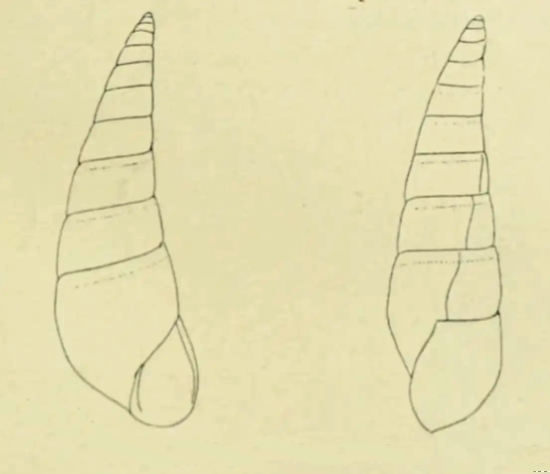
- Shell of Melanella ima (original image)

Scientific classification
- Kingdom: Animalia
- Phylum: Mollusca
- Class: Gastropoda
- Subclass: Caenogastropoda
- Order: Littorinimorpha
- Family: Eulimidae
- Genus: Melanella
- Species: M. ima

Binomial name
- Melanella ima Pilsbry, 1918

= Melanella ima =

Species of gastropod

Melanella ima is a species of sea snail, a marine gastropod mollusk in the family Eulimidae. The species is one of many species known to exist within the genus, Melanella.

== Description ==
The length of the shell attains 4.3 mm, its diameter 1.35 mm.

(Original description) The shell is small and slender, and the upper half curves strongly to the right. It is smooth and whitish, with the linear suture rather narrowly bordered in gray. The whorls are very slightly convex. A series of linear varices on the right side recedes to the dorsal side above. The aperture is shaped as in Melanella kanaka, and, as in that species, the outer lip arches forward strongly. The shell is more slender than M. kanaka and is curved for a greater part of its length. The shape of the body whorl distinguishes it from Melanella mimus.

== Distribution ==
This marine species occurs off Hawaii.
