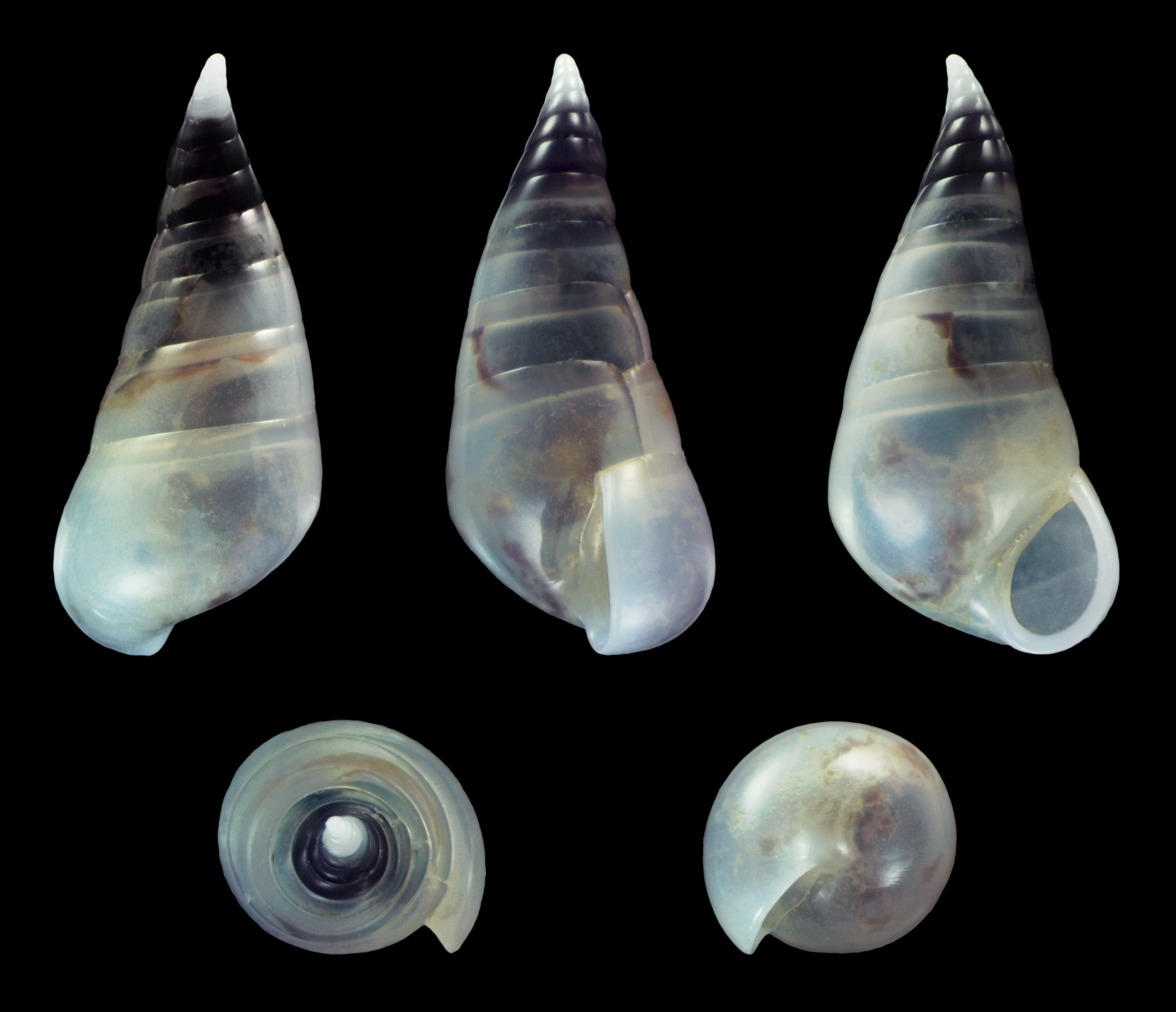
- Shell of Melanella mimus

Scientific classification
- Kingdom: Animalia
- Phylum: Mollusca
- Class: Gastropoda
- Subclass: Caenogastropoda
- Order: Littorinimorpha
- Family: Eulimidae
- Genus: Melanella
- Species: M. mimus

Binomial name
- Melanella mimus Pilsbry, 1918

= Melanella mimus =

Species of gastropod

Melanella mimus is a species of sea snail, a marine gastropod mollusk in the family Eulimidae. The species is one of many species known to exist within the genus, Melanella.

== Description ==
The length of the shell attains 5.3 mm, its diameter 2 mm.

(Original description) The shell is rather slender, and the spire has a distinct double curvature. It is smooth and white. The suture is linear and not impressed. A series of linear varices runs up the right side, spirally receding to the dorsal side as usual. The whorls are almost flat, the body whorl being very obtusely subangular. The aperture is ovate; the columella is moderately concave, and the parietal callus is thin. The outer lip arches strongly forward.

== Distribution ==
This marine species occurs off Hawaii.
