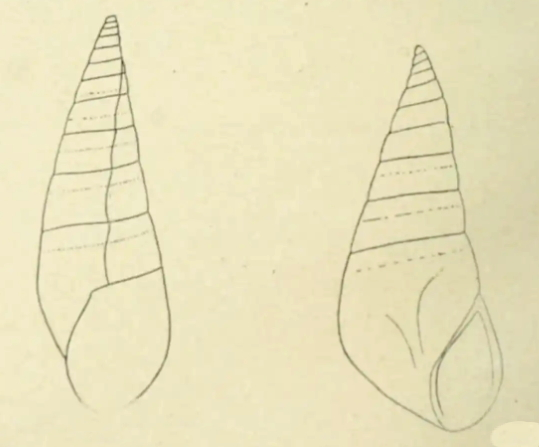
- Shell of Melanella kanaka (holotype)

Scientific classification
- Kingdom: Animalia
- Phylum: Mollusca
- Class: Gastropoda
- Subclass: Caenogastropoda
- Order: Littorinimorpha
- Family: Eulimidae
- Genus: Melanella
- Species: M. kanaka

Binomial name
- Melanella kanaka Pilsbry, 1917

Synonyms
- Balcis kanaka (Pilsbry, 1917) (Balcis is considered a junior synonym of Melanella)

= Melanella kanaka =

Species of gastropod

Melanella kanaka is a species of sea snail, a marine gastropod mollusk in the family Eulimidae. The species is one of multiple species known to exist within the genus, Melanella.

== Description ==
The length of the shell attains 4.2 mm, its diameter 1.62 mm.

(Original description) The shell is very small and conic, attenuated and recurved in the upper third. It is smooth and whitish. The suture is linear and superficial, broadly gray-margined below, with the margin defined by a whitish line. A continuous series of impressed, linear varices runs up the right side, receding but little upward. The shell contains 10 whorls. The whorls of the spire are scarcely convex, the body whorl being moderately convex. The aperture is small and subovate, with the inner margin much less curved than the outer. The outer lip arches very strongly forward, as seen in profile.

== Distribution ==
This marine species occurs off Hawaii.
