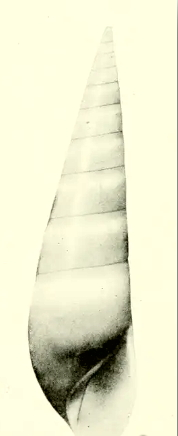
- Shell of Melanella borealis (original image)

Scientific classification
- Kingdom: Animalia
- Phylum: Mollusca
- Class: Gastropoda
- Subclass: Caenogastropoda
- Order: Littorinimorpha
- Family: Eulimidae
- Genus: Melanella
- Species: M. borealis

Binomial name
- Melanella borealis Bartsch, 1915

Synonyms
- Melanella (Melanella) micans borealis Bartsch, 1917 superseded rank

= Melanella borealis =

Species of gastropod

Melanella borealis is a species of sea snail, a marine gastropod mollusk in the family Eulimidae. The species is one of many species known to exist within the genus, Melanella.

== Description ==
(Original description) This species is similar to Melanella micans (P. P. Carpenter, 1865) but is uniformly more slender than M. micans occurring to the south.

The species has 12 whorls and measures 11.3 mm. in length and 3.3 mm. in diameter.

== Distribution ==
This species occurs off the Pacific coast of North Amerida off Alaska (Kodiak Island), British Columbia and Vancouver Island.
