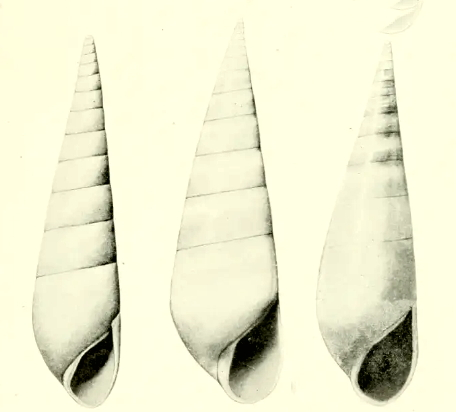
- Shell of Melanella micans (original image)

Scientific classification
- Kingdom: Animalia
- Phylum: Mollusca
- Class: Gastropoda
- Subclass: Caenogastropoda
- Order: Littorinimorpha
- Family: Eulimidae
- Genus: Melanella
- Species: M. micans

Binomial name
- Melanella micans (P. P. Carpenter, 1865)

Synonyms
- Balcis micans (P. P. Carpenter, 1865); Eulima micans P. P. Carpenter, 1865 superseded combination; Eulima micans P. P. Carpenter, 1864 nomen nudum; Melanella (Melanella) micans (P. P. Carpenter, 1865)

= Melanella micans =

Species of gastropod

Melanella micans is a species of sea snail, a marine gastropod mollusk in the family Eulimidae. The species is one of many species known to exist within the genus, Melanella.

== Description ==
The length of the shell attains 12.5 mm, its diameter 4 mm.

(Original description) The shell is straight and elongate-conic in outline, appearing bluish-white once the animal has been removed from it. When the animal has been allowed to dry inside the shell, however, it shows through the substance of the shell itself and lends the surface a mottled, brownish aspect. Where this brownish coloration is present, it usually extends over the upper half of the specimen.

The shell contains 15 whorls. The whorls are flattened and are decidedly appressed at the summit, while the sutures present as a very fine, impressed line. The base is moderately long and well rounded. The aperture is oval in shape, with its posterior angle very acute. The outer lip is thin at the edge; it bends back immediately below the summit, then sweeps forward to form a claw-shaped element, the center of which coincides with the periphery. A second backward deflection of the outer lip occurs at its junction with the inner lip, which is moderately strong, curved, and twisted, and which is partly reflected over and adnate to the base. The parietal wall is covered with a moderately thick callus.

== Distribution ==
This species occurs off the Pacific coast of Mexico and Panama.
