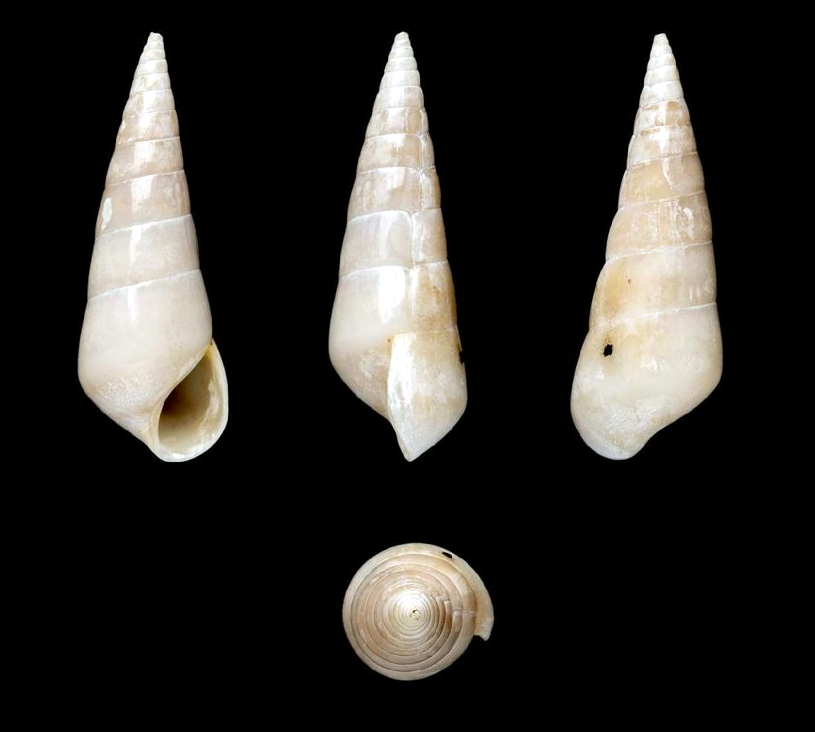
- Shell of Melanella hastata (syntype at the Natural History Museum, London))

Scientific classification
- Kingdom: Animalia
- Phylum: Mollusca
- Class: Gastropoda
- Subclass: Caenogastropoda
- Order: Littorinimorpha
- Family: Eulimidae
- Genus: Melanella
- Species: M. hastata

Binomial name
- Melanella hastata (G. B. Sowerby I, 1834)

Synonyms
- Eulima hastata G. B. Sowerby I, 1834 ·

= Melanella hastata =

Species of gastropod

Melanella hastata is a species of sea snail, a marine gastropod mollusk in the family Eulimidae. The species is one of many species known to exist within the genus, Melanella.

== Description ==
(Original description) The whorls are flattened, the first being opaque and yellowish while the body whorl is white and diaphanous. The body whorl is subangular. The aperture is small and oval, and it is pointed posteriorly.

(Described as Eulima hastata) The shell is rather straight and pyramidal in shape. Its whorls are somewhat flattened, with the body whorl displaying an angulated periphery. The coloration is rosy, shading into brownish above the middle.

== Distribution ==
This species occurs in the Pacific Ocean off California (USA), Mexico; also off the Philippines and Mauritius.
