= Melanella modesta (homonym) =

Scientific classification
- Kingdom: Animalia
- Phylum: Mollusca
- Class: Gastropoda
- Subclass: Caenogastropoda
- Order: Littorinimorpha
- Family: Eulimidae
- Genus: Melanella
- Species: M. modesta

Binomial name
- Melanella modesta (Thiele, 1930)

Species of gastropod

Melanella modesta is a species of sea snail, a marine gastropod mollusk in the family Eulimidae.

This taxon is a junior homonym of Melanella modesta (Thiele, 1925) from South Africa, and will likely be renamed in the future.

== Distribution ==
This marine species occurs off Western Australia.
