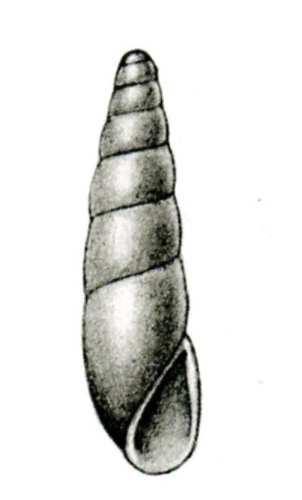
- Shell of Melanella modesta (original drawing)

Scientific classification
- Kingdom: Animalia
- Phylum: Mollusca
- Class: Gastropoda
- Subclass: Caenogastropoda
- Order: Littorinimorpha
- Family: Eulimidae
- Genus: Melanella
- Species: M. modesta

Binomial name
- Melanella modesta (Thiele, 1925)

Synonyms
- Eulima modesta Thiele, 1925

= Melanella modesta =

Species of gastropod

Melanella modesta is a species of sea snail, a marine gastropod mollusk in the family Eulimidae.

== Description ==
The shell is nearly 4 mm high and nearly 1 mm in diameter, while the aperture measures 1.25 mm in length.

(Original description in German) The shell has seven whorls that increase evenly in length and are distinctly convex, with a somewhat impressed suture. The initial whorl is relatively large and rounded, whereas the body whorl is only slightly convex. The aperture is long and narrow, sharply angled above, and its margins are connected by a thin callus; on the right side, the margin projects forwards in a rounded curve.

== Distribution ==
This marine species occurs off the Agulhas Bank, South Africa.
