= Melanella laurae =

- Shell of Melanella laurae (original image)

Scientific classification
- Kingdom: Animalia
- Phylum: Mollusca
- Class: Gastropoda
- Subclass: Caenogastropoda
- Order: Littorinimorpha
- Family: Eulimidae
- Genus: Melanella
- Species: M. laurae

Binomial name
- Melanella laurae (Friele, 1886)

Synonyms
- Eulima laurae Friele, 1886 (original combination)

Species of gastropod

Melanella laurae is a species of sea snail, a marine gastropod mollusk in the family Eulimidae.

== Description ==
The length of the shell attains 4.2 mm, its diameter 1 mm.

(Original description) The shell is cylindrical, white, lustrous, solid, and perfectly smooth, with eight slowly increasing, somewhat convex whorls. The suture is shallow but distinct, and the apex is obtusely rounded. The aperture, which measures about one-fourth of the length of the shell, is pyriform. The outer lip is flexuous and forms a broad sinus at its upper extremity. The inner lip is somewhat thickened, while the columella is bent and doubled back, causing the umbilicus to be perfectly closed.

== Distribution ==
This marine species occurs off the Faroe Islands.
