= Melanella cuspidata =

Scientific classification
- Kingdom: Animalia
- Phylum: Mollusca
- Class: Gastropoda
- Subclass: Caenogastropoda
- Order: Littorinimorpha
- Family: Eulimidae
- Genus: Melanella
- Species: M. cuspidata

Binomial name
- Melanella cuspidata (A. Adams, 1854)

Synonyms
- Eulima cuspidata A. Adams, 1854 (original combination)

Species of gastropod

Melanella cuspidata is a species of sea snail, a marine gastropod mollusk in the family Eulimidae. The species is one of many species known to exist within the genus, Melanella.

== Description ==
(Original description in Latin) The shell is subulate-pyramidal, whitish, solid, and straight. It has 12 whorls, which are somewhat convex; the body whorl is rounded. The aperture is oblong-oval; the lip is callous and nearly straight anteriorly; the outer lip is acute.

== Distribution ==
This species has a wide distribution and occurs off India, Japan, the Philippines (Cebu Island) and Australia (Queensland)
