= Melanella extremis =

- Shell of † Melanella extremis (original image)

Scientific classification
- Kingdom: Animalia
- Phylum: Mollusca
- Class: Gastropoda
- Subclass: Caenogastropoda
- Order: Littorinimorpha
- Family: Eulimidae
- Genus: Melanella
- Species: †M. extremis

Binomial name
- †Melanella extremis (Aldrich, 1911)

Synonyms
- † Eulima extremis Aldrich, 1911 superseded combination

Extinct species of gastropod

Melanella extremis is an extinct species of sea snail, a marine gastropod mollusk in the family Eulimidae.

== Description ==
The length of the shell attains 7 mm.

(Original description) The shell is polished, with nine or ten whorls. The suture is very shallow and indistinctly visible. The aperture is elongate, the outer lip is slightly sinuous, and the inner lip is reflected over the lower part of the columella.

== Distribution ==
Fossils of this species have been found in Claibornian strata in Alabama, USA.
