= Campylorhaphion famelicum =

Scientific classification
- Kingdom: Animalia
- Phylum: Mollusca
- Class: Gastropoda
- Subclass: Caenogastropoda
- Order: Littorinimorpha
- Family: Eulimidae
- Genus: Campylorhaphion
- Species: C. famelicum

Binomial name
- Campylorhaphion famelicum (Watson, 1883)

Synonyms
- Eulima famelica Watson, 1883

Species of gastropod

Campylorhaphion famelicum is a species of sea snail, a marine gastropod mollusk in the family Eulimidae. The species is one of two known species to exist within the genus, Campylorhaphion, the other being Campylorhaphion machaeropse.

== Distribution ==
This species is located in the following areas:

- European waters (ERMS scope)
- United Kingdom Exclusive Economic Zone
