= Hebeulima columnaria =

Scientific classification
- Kingdom: Animalia
- Phylum: Mollusca
- Class: Gastropoda
- Subclass: Caenogastropoda
- Order: Littorinimorpha
- Family: Eulimidae
- Genus: Hebeulima
- Species: H. columnaria

Binomial name
- Hebeulima columnaria (May, 1916)

Synonyms
- Eulima columnaria May, 1915 (original combination)

Species of mollusc

Hebeulima columnaria is a species of sea snail, a marine gastropod mollusk in the family Eulimidae.
