= Parvioris =

Scientific classification
- Kingdom: Animalia
- Phylum: Mollusca
- Class: Gastropoda
- Subclass: Caenogastropoda
- Order: Littorinimorpha
- Family: Eulimidae
- Genus: Parvioris; Warén, 1981

Type species
- Eulima fulvescens A. Adams, 1866

Genus of gastropods

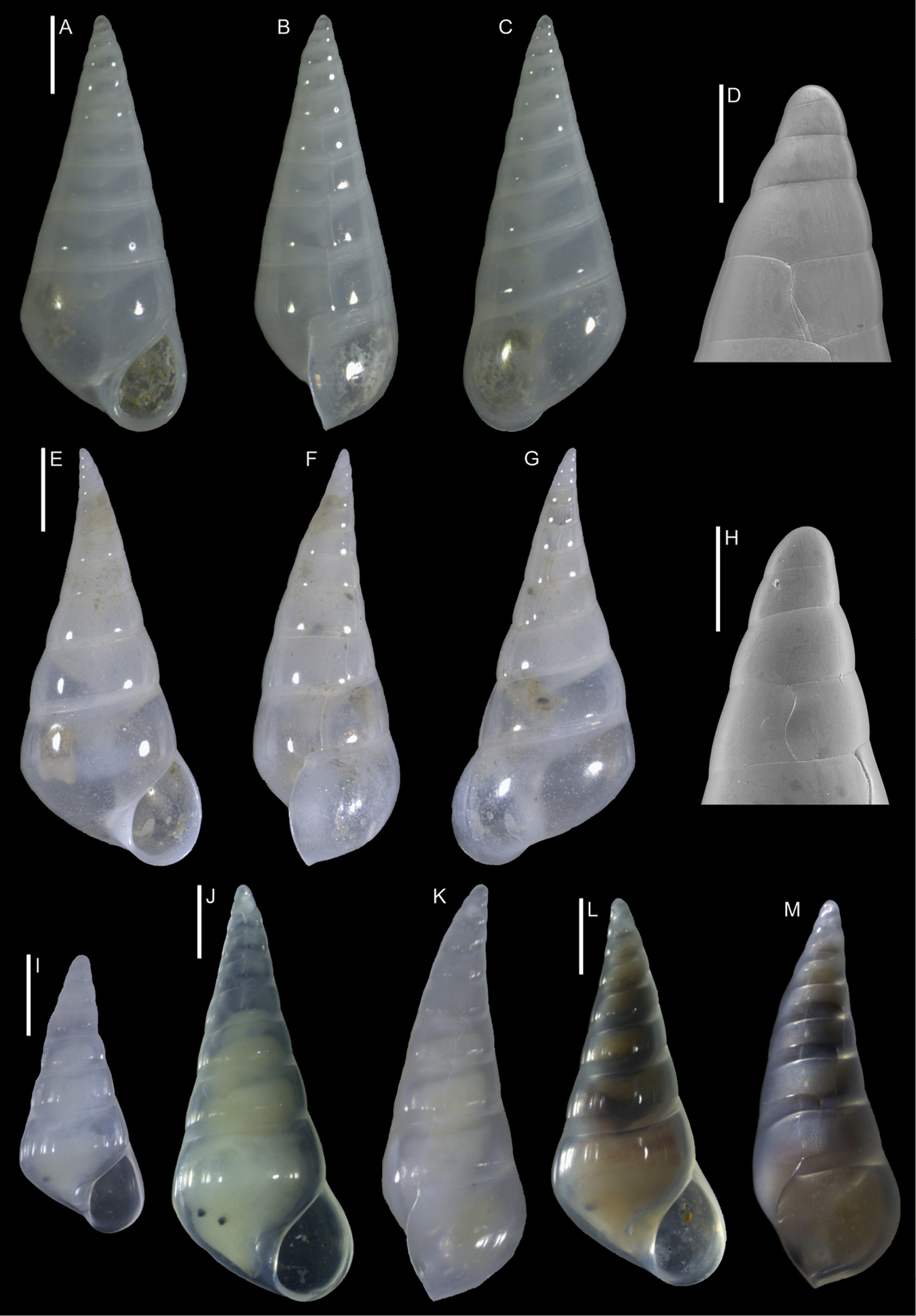

Parvioris is a genus of small ectoparasitic sea snails, marine gastropod mollusks in the family Eulimidae.

== Species ==
Species within the genus Parvioris:

- Parvioris astropectenicola (Kuroda & Habe, 1950)
- Parvioris australiensis Warén, 1981
- Parvioris blakeae Warén, 1981
- Parvioris brevis (G. B. Sowerby I, 1834)
- Parvioris carneola (Gould, 1861)
- Parvioris dilecta (E. A. Smith, 1899)
- Parvioris equestris (Koehler & Vaney, 1912)
- Parvioris fulvescens (A. Adams, 1866)
- Parvioris ibizenca (Nordsieck, 1968)
- Parvioris imitatrix (Boettger, 1893)
- Parvioris inflexa (Pease, 1867)
- Parvioris innocens (Thiele, 1925)
- Parvioris mortoni Warén, 1981
- Parvioris natalensis (E. A. Smith, 1899)
- Parvioris nitens (Brazier, 1876)
- Parvioris noumeae Warén, 1981
- Parvioris shoplandi (Melvill, 1898)
- Parvioris sowerbyi (Barnard, 1963)
- Parvioris styliferoides (Melvill & Standen, 1901)
- Parvioris subobtusa (Laseron, 1955)

Species brought into synonymy

- Parvioris anderswareni van Aartsen & Giannuzzi-Savelli, 1991 : synonym of Parvioris ibizenca (Nordsieck, 1968)
- Parvioris brevicula (Dunker MS, Tryon, 1886): synonym of Oceanida mindoroensis (Adams & Reeve, 1850)
- Parvioris bryani (Pilsbry, 1918) : synonym of Melanella bryani Pilsbry, 1918
- Parvioris caledonica (Morlet, 1881) : synonym of Parvioris fulvescens (A. Adams, 1866)
- Parvioris lata (Laseron, 1955) : synonym of Parvioris subobtusa (Laseron, 1955)
- Parvioris mabutii (Nomura & Hatai, 1935) : synonym of Parvioris fulvescens (A. Adams, 1866)
- Parvioris microstoma (Brusina, 1869) : synonym of Parvioris ibizenca (Nordsieck, 1968)
- Parvioris nana (Monterosato, 1878) : synonym of Nanobalcis nana (Monterosato, 1878)
- Parvioris saccata (Boettger, 1893) : synonym of Parvioris inflexa (Pease, 1867)
- Parvioris submarginata (Sowerby, 1901) : synonym of Parvioris imitatrix (Boettger, 1893)
