= Asterolamia cingulata =

Scientific classification
- Kingdom: Animalia
- Phylum: Mollusca
- Class: Gastropoda
- Subclass: Caenogastropoda
- Order: Littorinimorpha
- Family: Eulimidae
- Genus: Asterolamia
- Species: A. cingulata

Binomial name
- Asterolamia cingulata Warén, 1980

Species of gastropod

Asterolamia cingulata is a species of sea snail, a marine gastropod mollusk in the family Eulimidae. The species is one of two known species within the genus Asterolamia, the other being Asterolamia hians.
