= Bacula morisyuichiroi =

Scientific classification
- Kingdom: Animalia
- Phylum: Mollusca
- Class: Gastropoda
- Subclass: Caenogastropoda
- Order: Littorinimorpha
- Family: Eulimidae
- Genus: Bacula
- Species: B. morisyuichiroi

Binomial name
- Bacula morisyuichiroi (Habe, 1968)

Synonyms
- Charilda morisyuichiroi (Habe, 1968); Subeulima morisyuichiroi Habe, 1968

Species of gastropod

Bacula morisyuichiroi is a species of sea snail, a marine gastropod mollusc in the family Eulimidae. The species is one of three other species known to exist within this genus of gastropods, the other species are Bacula lamberti and Bacula striolata.

== Distribution ==
This marine species occurs off Japan and the Society Islands.
