= Bacula kajiyamai =

Scientific classification
- Kingdom: Animalia
- Phylum: Mollusca
- Class: Gastropoda
- Subclass: Caenogastropoda
- Order: Littorinimorpha
- Family: Eulimidae
- Genus: Bacula
- Species: B. kajiyamai

Binomial name
- Bacula kajiyamai (T. Habe, 1961)

Synonyms
- Chrystella kajiyamai T. Habe, 1961 superseded combination

Species of gastropod

Bacula kajiyamai is a species of sea snail, a marine gastropod mollusc in the family Eulimidae.

== Distribution ==
This marine species occurs off Japan.
