= Chileutomia neozelanica =

Scientific classification
- Kingdom: Animalia
- Phylum: Mollusca
- Class: Gastropoda
- Subclass: Caenogastropoda
- Order: Littorinimorpha
- Family: Eulimidae
- Genus: Chileutomia
- Species: C. neozelanica

Binomial name
- Chileutomia neozelanica Powell, 1940

Species of gastropod

Chileutomia neozelanica is a species of sea snail, a marine gastropod mollusk in the family Eulimidae.
