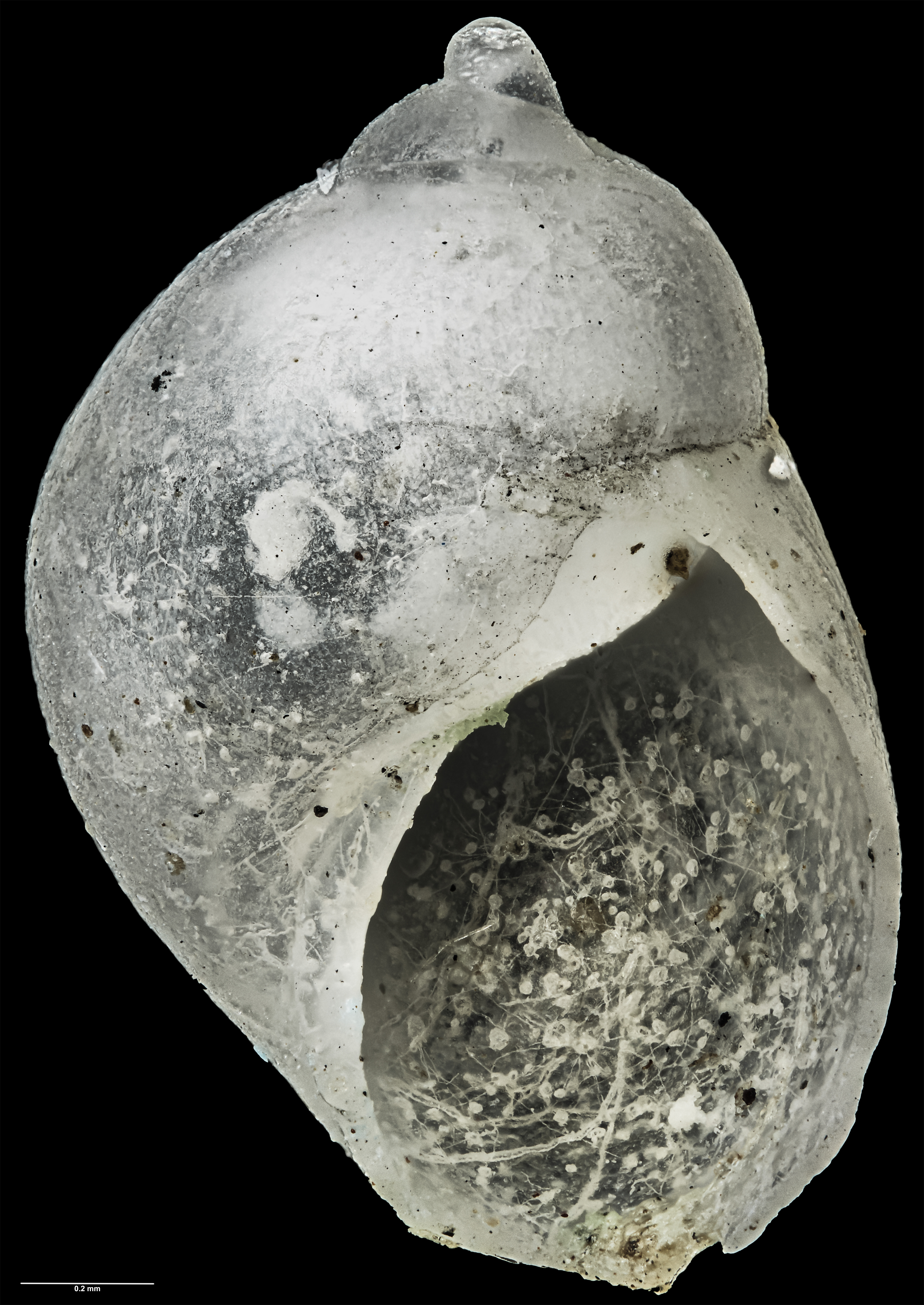
- Holotype from Auckland War Memorial Museum

Scientific classification
- Kingdom: Animalia
- Phylum: Mollusca
- Class: Gastropoda
- Subclass: Caenogastropoda
- Order: Littorinimorpha
- Family: Eulimidae
- Genus: Pelseneeria
- Species: P. bountyensis

Binomial name
- Pelseneeria bountyensis (Powell, 1933)

Synonyms
- Hypermastus bountyensis Powell, 1933; Venustilifer bountyensis (Powell, 1933)

= Pelseneeria bountyensis =

Species of gastropod

Pelseneeria bountyensis is a species of small deep-water sea snail. It is a marine gastropod mollusc in the family Eulimidae.
