= Entocolax schiemenzi =

Scientific classification
- Kingdom: Animalia
- Phylum: Mollusca
- Class: Gastropoda
- Subclass: Caenogastropoda
- Order: Littorinimorpha
- Family: Eulimidae
- Genus: Entocolax
- Species: E. schiemenzi

Binomial name
- Entocolax schiemenzi Voigt, 1901

Species of gastropod

Entocolax schiemenzi is a species of sea snail, a marine gastropod mollusk in the family Eulimidae.
