= Subniso osorioae =

Scientific classification
- Kingdom: Animalia
- Phylum: Mollusca
- Class: Gastropoda
- Subclass: Caenogastropoda
- Order: Littorinimorpha
- Family: Eulimidae
- Genus: Subniso
- Species: S. osorioae

Binomial name
- Subniso osorioae Raines, 2003

Synonyms
- Hemiliostraca osorioae (Raines, 2003)

Species of gastropod

Subniso osorioae is a species of sea snail, a marine gastropod mollusk in the family Eulimidae.
