= Diacolax cucumariae =

Scientific classification
- Kingdom: Animalia
- Phylum: Mollusca
- Class: Gastropoda
- Subclass: Caenogastropoda
- Order: Littorinimorpha
- Family: Eulimidae
- Genus: Diacolax
- Species: D. cucumariae

Binomial name
- Diacolax cucumariae Mandahl-Barth, 1946

Species of gastropod

Diacolax cucumariae is a species of medium-sized sea snail, a marine gastropod mollusk in the family Eulimidae. This is the only known species to exist within the family, Diacolax.
