= Goriella sandroi =

Scientific classification
- Kingdom: Animalia
- Phylum: Mollusca
- Class: Gastropoda
- Subclass: Caenogastropoda
- Order: Littorinimorpha
- Family: Eulimidae
- Genus: Goriella
- Species: G. sandroi

Binomial name
- Goriella sandroi Moolenbeek, 2008

Species of gastropod

Goriella sandroi is a species of sea snail, a marine gastropod mollusk in the family Eulimidae. This is the only species known to exist within the genus, Goriella.
