= Entocolax trochodotae =

Scientific classification
- Kingdom: Animalia
- Phylum: Mollusca
- Class: Gastropoda
- Subclass: Caenogastropoda
- Order: Littorinimorpha
- Family: Eulimidae
- Genus: Entocolax
- Species: E. trochodotae

Binomial name
- Entocolax trochodotae Heding, 1934

Species of gastropod

Entocolax trochodotae is a species of sea snail, a marine gastropod mollusk in the family Eulimidae.
