= Hebeulima crassiceps =

Scientific classification
- Kingdom: Animalia
- Phylum: Mollusca
- Class: Gastropoda
- Subclass: Caenogastropoda
- Order: Littorinimorpha
- Family: Eulimidae
- Genus: Hebeulima
- Species: H. crassiceps

Binomial name
- Hebeulima crassiceps Laseron, 1955

Species of gastropod

Hebeulima crassiceps is a species of sea snail, a marine gastropod mollusk in the family Eulimidae. This species, along with Hebeulima insignis belongs to the genus Hebeulima.
