= Subniso hipolitensis =

- Shell of Subniso hipolitensis (original image)

Scientific classification
- Kingdom: Animalia
- Phylum: Mollusca
- Class: Gastropoda
- Subclass: Caenogastropoda
- Order: Littorinimorpha
- Family: Eulimidae
- Genus: Subniso
- Species: S. hipolitensis

Binomial name
- Subniso hipolitensis (Bartsch, 1917)

Synonyms
- Niso hipolitensis Bartsch, 1917 · unaccepted (original combination)

Species of gastropod

Subniso hipolitensis is a species of sea snail, a marine gastropod mollusk in the family Eulimidae.

== Description ==
The length of the shell attains 3.1 mm, its diameter 1.2 mm.

(Original description) The very small shell is elongate-conic, and narrowly umbilicated. The apex is yellowish-white, and the base is white with a broad median brown band, while the anterior half of the aperture is white. The surface is polished and marked by fine lines of growth only. The shell contains 10 whorls. The suture is feebly impressed, and the periphery of the body whorl is angulated. The base is short and well rounded. The aperture is broadly oval with an acute posterior angle; the outer lip is thin, curved, and slightly patulose, and the inner lip is curved and revolute, almost covering the narrow umbilicus.

== Distribution ==
The species occurs off Lower California, Mexico and Ecuador.
