= Campylorhaphion flexum =

Scientific classification
- Kingdom: Animalia
- Phylum: Mollusca
- Class: Gastropoda
- Subclass: Caenogastropoda
- Order: Littorinimorpha
- Family: Eulimidae
- Genus: Campylorhaphion
- Species: C. flexum

Binomial name
- Campylorhaphion flexum (A. Adams, 1861)

Synonyms
- Eulima flexa A. Adams, 1861

Species of mollusc

Campylorhaphion flexum is a species of sea snail, a marine gastropod mollusk in the family Eulimidae. The species is one of a number within the genus Eulima.
