= Entocolax schwanitschi =

Scientific classification
- Kingdom: Animalia
- Phylum: Mollusca
- Class: Gastropoda
- Subclass: Caenogastropoda
- Order: Littorinimorpha
- Family: Eulimidae
- Genus: Entocolax
- Species: E. schwanitschi

Binomial name
- Entocolax schwanitschi Heding in Heding & Mandahl-Barth, 1938

Species of gastropod

Entocolax schwanitschi is a species of sea snail, a marine gastropod mollusk in the family Eulimidae.

== Distribution ==
- Marine
