= Acrochalix callosa =

Scientific classification
- Kingdom: Animalia
- Phylum: Mollusca
- Class: Gastropoda
- Subclass: Caenogastropoda
- Order: Littorinimorpha
- Family: Eulimidae
- Genus: Acrochalix
- Species: A. callosa

Binomial name
- Acrochalix callosa Bouchet & Warén, 1986

Species of gastropod

Acrochalix callosa is a species of medium-sized sea snail, a marine gastropod mollusk in the family Eulimidae. This is the only known species within the genus Acrochalix.

== Distribution ==
This marine species is mainly distributed within the north east Atlantic Ocean.
