= Clypeastericola natalensis =

Scientific classification
- Kingdom: Animalia
- Phylum: Mollusca
- Class: Gastropoda
- Subclass: Caenogastropoda
- Order: Littorinimorpha
- Family: Eulimidae
- Genus: Clypeastericola
- Species: C. natalensis

Binomial name
- Clypeastericola natalensis Warén, 1994

Species of gastropod

Clypeastericola natalensis is a species of sea snail, a marine gastropod mollusk in the family Eulimidae. The species is one of two known species to exist within the genus, Clypeastericola, the other one is known as Clypeastericola clypeastericola.
