= Goubinia insueta =

Scientific classification
- Kingdom: Animalia
- Phylum: Mollusca
- Class: Gastropoda
- Subclass: Caenogastropoda
- Order: Littorinimorpha
- Family: Eulimidae
- Genus: Goubinia
- Species: G. insueta

Binomial name
- Goubinia insueta Dautzenberg, 1923

Synonyms
- Eulima insueta Dautzenberg, 1923

Species of gastropod

Goubinia insueta is a species of sea snail, a marine gastropod mollusk in the family Eulimidae. This is the only species known to exist within the genus Goubinia.
