= Concavibalcis scalaris =

Scientific classification
- Kingdom: Animalia
- Phylum: Mollusca
- Class: Gastropoda
- Subclass: Caenogastropoda
- Order: Littorinimorpha
- Family: Eulimidae
- Genus: Concavibalcis
- Species: C. scalaris

Binomial name
- Concavibalcis scalaris Warén, 1980

Species of gastropod

Concavibalcis scalaris is a species of sea snail, a marine gastropod mollusk in the family Eulimidae. The species is the only one known to exist within the genus, Concavibalcis.
