= Entocolax rimskykorsakovi =

Scientific classification
- Kingdom: Animalia
- Phylum: Mollusca
- Class: Gastropoda
- Subclass: Caenogastropoda
- Order: Littorinimorpha
- Family: Eulimidae
- Genus: Entocolax
- Species: E. rimskykorsakovi

Binomial name
- Entocolax rimskykorsakovi Ivanov, 1945

Species of gastropod

Entocolax rimskykorsakovi is a species of sea snail, a marine gastropod mollusk in the family Eulimidae.
