= Arcuella mirifica =

Scientific classification
- Kingdom: Animalia
- Phylum: Mollusca
- Class: Gastropoda
- Subclass: Caenogastropoda
- Order: Littorinimorpha
- Family: Eulimidae
- Genus: Arcuella
- Species: A. mirifica

Binomial name
- Arcuella mirifica G. Nevill & H. Nevill, 1874

Species of gastropod

Arcuella mirifica is a species of sea snail, a marine gastropod mollusk in the family Eulimidae. The species is monotypic within the genus Arcuella.
