= Gasterosiphon deimatis =

Scientific classification
- Kingdom: Animalia
- Phylum: Mollusca
- Class: Gastropoda
- Subclass: Caenogastropoda
- Order: Littorinimorpha
- Family: Eulimidae
- Genus: Gasterosiphon
- Species: G. deimatis

Binomial name
- Gasterosiphon deimatis Koehler & Vaney, 1903

Species of gastropod

Gasterosiphon deimatis is a species of sea snail, a marine gastropod mollusk in the family Eulimidae. This is the only species known to exist within the genus, Gasterosiphon.
