= Chileutomia subvaricosa =

Scientific classification
- Kingdom: Animalia
- Phylum: Mollusca
- Class: Gastropoda
- Subclass: Caenogastropoda
- Order: Littorinimorpha
- Family: Eulimidae
- Genus: Chileutomia
- Species: C. subvaricosa

Binomial name
- Chileutomia subvaricosa Tate & Cossmann, 1898

Species of gastropod

Chileutomia subvaricosa is a species of sea snail, a marine gastropod mollusk in the family Eulimidae.
