= Echiuroidicola cicatricosa =

Scientific classification
- Kingdom: Animalia
- Phylum: Mollusca
- Class: Gastropoda
- Subclass: Caenogastropoda
- Order: Littorinimorpha
- Family: Eulimidae
- Genus: Echiuroidicola
- Species: E. cicatricosa

Binomial name
- Echiuroidicola cicatricosa Warén, 1980

Species of gastropod

Echiuroidicola cicatricosa is a species of sea snail, a marine gastropod mollusk in the family Eulimidae. The species is the only known species to exist within the genus, Echiuroidicola.
