= Hebeulima insignis =

Hebebulima insignis

Scientific classification
- Kingdom: Animalia
- Phylum: Mollusca
- Class: Gastropoda
- Subclass: Caenogastropoda
- Order: Littorinimorpha
- Family: Eulimidae
- Genus: Hebeulima
- Species: H. insignis

Binomial name
- Hebeulima insignis Turton, 1932

Synonyms
- Eulima insignis Turton, 1932

Species of gastropod

Hebeulima insignis is a species of sea snail, a marine gastropod mollusk in the family Eulimidae. This species, along with Hebeulima crassiceps belongs in the genus Hebeulima.
