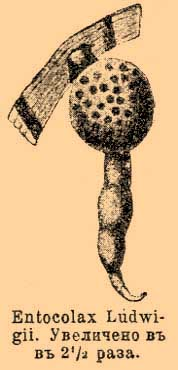

Scientific classification
- Kingdom: Animalia
- Phylum: Mollusca
- Class: Gastropoda
- Subclass: Caenogastropoda
- Order: Littorinimorpha
- Family: Eulimidae
- Genus: Entocolax
- Species: E. ludwigii

Binomial name
- Entocolax ludwigii Voigt, 1888

Synonyms
- Entocolax ludwigi Voigt, 1888

= Entocolax ludwigii =

Species of gastropod

Entocolax ludwigii is a species of parasitic sea snail, a marine gastropod mollusk in the family Eulimidae. The species is notable for being commonly misspelled as Entocolax ludwigi, this was the original name for this species of Caenogastropoda, the incorrect name was corrected shortly after Voigt gave the taxonomic name for this species in 1888.

== Distribution ==
This species occurs in the following locations:

- European waters (ERMS scope)
