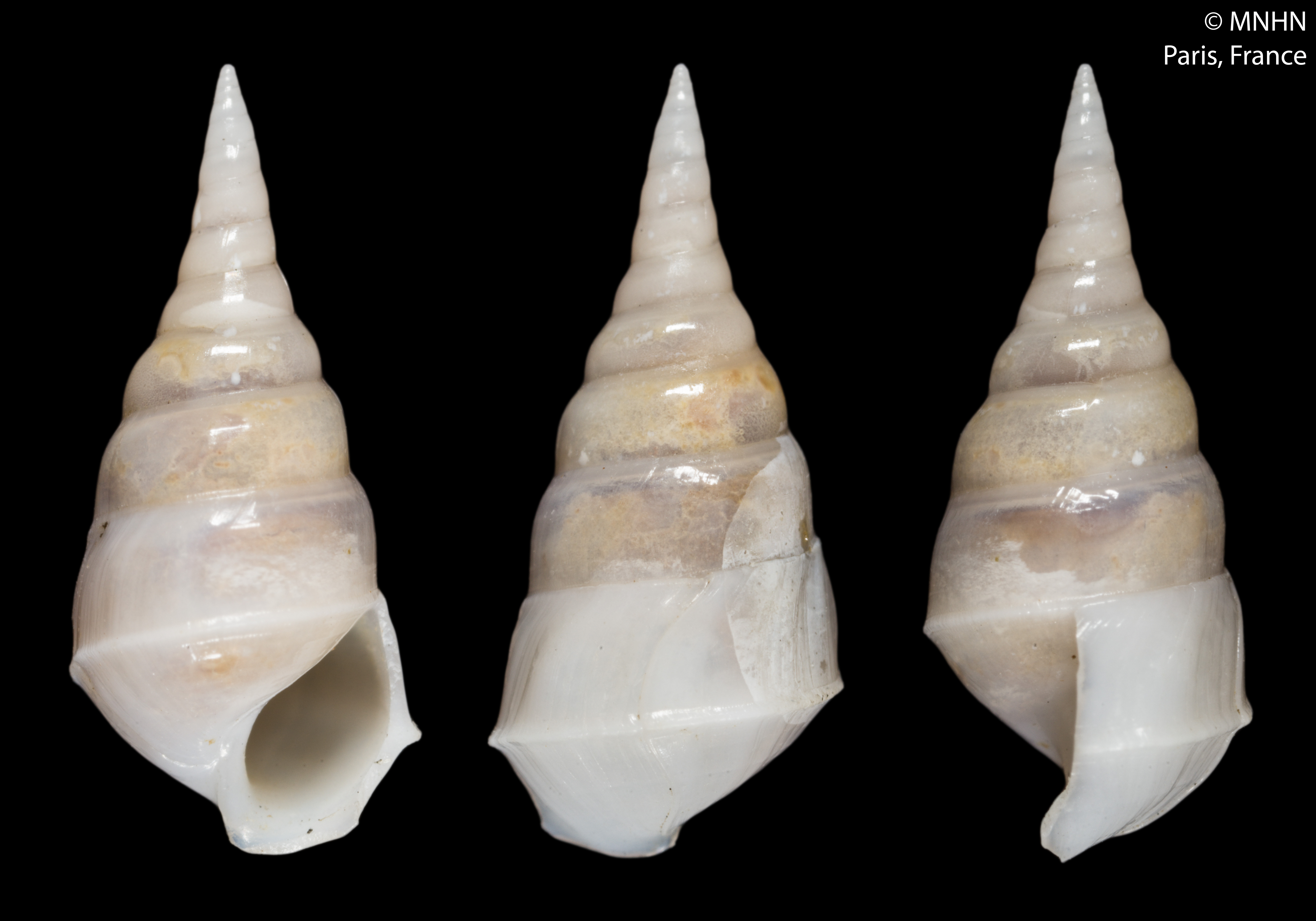
- Scalenostoma carinatum

Scientific classification
- Kingdom: Animalia
- Phylum: Mollusca
- Class: Gastropoda
- Subclass: Caenogastropoda
- Order: Littorinimorpha
- Superfamily: Vanikoroidea
- Family: Eulimidae
- Genus: Scalenostoma; Deshayes, 1863

Type species
- Scalenostoma carinatum Deshayes, 1863

Synonyms
- Hyperlia Pilsbry, 1918; Odostomia (Scalenostoma); Scalenostoma (Hyperlia) Pilsbry, 1917 (original combination); Stilimella Laseron, 1955

= Scalenostoma =

Genus of gastropods

Scalenostoma is a genus of very small ectoparasitic sea snails, marine gastropod mollusks or micromollusks in the Eulimidae family.

== Species ==
Species within the genera Scalenostoma include:

- Scalenostoma babylonia (Bartsch, 1912)
- Scalenostoma carinatum Deshayes, 1863
- Scalenostoma lodderae (Petterd, 1884)
- Scalenostoma perrierae Barros, Padovan & Santos, 2001
- Scalenostoma subulatum (Broderip, 1832)

Taxon inquirendum

- Scalenostoma mariei P. Fischer, 1886

Species brought into synonymy

- Scalenostoma abbreviata (Mörch, 1875): synonym of Scalenostoma subulatum (Broderip, 1832)
- Scalenostoma apiculatum Souverbie, 1875: synonym of Scalenostoma carinatum Deshayes, 1863
- Scalenostoma corallina (Chemnitz, 1795): synonym of Scalenostoma subulatum (Broderip, 1832)
- Scalenostoma deshayesi A. Adams, 1870: synonym of Scalenostoma carinatum Deshayes, 1863
- Scalenostoma hawaiiensis (Pilsbry, 1920): synonym of Scalenostoma subulatum (Broderip, 1832)
- Scalenostoma latior (Pilsbry, 1917): synonym of Scalenostoma carinatum Deshayes, 1863
- Scalenostoma lubricum P. Fischer, 1886: synonym of Scalenostoma carinatum Deshayes, 1863
- Scalenostoma pyramidata Laseron, 1951: synonym of Megastomia pyramidata (Laseron, 1951)
- Scalenostoma rangii (de Folin, 1867): synonym of Subniso rangii (de Folin, 1867)
- Scalenostoma remotissimus (Pilsbry, 1921): synonym of Scalenostoma subulatum (Broderip, 1832)
- Scalenostoma robusta (Petterd, 1884): synonym of Scalenostoma lodderae (Petterd, 1884)
- Scalenostoma striatum Hedley, 1905: synonym of Trochostilifer striatus (Hedley, 1905)
- Scalenostoma subcarina Laseron, 1951: synonym of Megastomia subcarina (Laseron, 1951)
- Scalenostoma suteri W. R. B. Oliver, 1915: synonym of Pyramidelloides suteri (W. R. B. Oliver, 1915)
- Scalenostoma thomasiae (Sowerby, 1878): synonym of Scalenostoma subulatum (Broderip, 1832)
- Scalenostoma thomasii (Sowerby, 1884): synonym of Scalenostoma subulatum (Broderip, 1832)
