= Asterophila japonica =

Scientific classification
- Kingdom: Animalia
- Phylum: Mollusca
- Class: Gastropoda
- Subclass: Caenogastropoda
- Order: Littorinimorpha
- Family: Eulimidae
- Genus: Asterophila
- Species: A. japonica

Binomial name
- Asterophila japonica Randall & Heath, 1912

Species of gastropod

Asterophila japonica is a species of sea snail, a marine gastropod mollusk in the family Eulimidae. The species is one of three known species within the genus Asterophila, the other congeneric species being Asterophila perknasteri and Asterophila rathbunasteri.

== Distribution ==
This mollusk's anatomy and its reported distribution has changed over time. It was once thought to have lived in the Atlantic Ocean around New Jersey. But now new evidence has shown that this species lives in starfish around the Asiatic Coast of the Pacific Ocean.

== Anatomy ==
This species has now been proven to be very similar to those in the families Melanellidae-Entoconchidae, so it is not necessary to allocate it its own family as the taxonomist Thiele did in 1929. However, there are some similarities and some differences. The larva is a typical veliger with smaller lobes like the Melanellidae-Entoconchidae. However this larva has a pericardium and a kidney.
