= Entocolax chiridotae =

Scientific classification
- Kingdom: Animalia
- Phylum: Mollusca
- Class: Gastropoda
- Subclass: Caenogastropoda
- Order: Littorinimorpha
- Family: Eulimidae
- Genus: Entocolax
- Species: E. chiridotae

Binomial name
- Entocolax chiridotae Scarlato, 1951

Species of gastropod

Entocolax chiridotae is a species of sea snail, a marine gastropod mollusk in the family Eulimidae.
