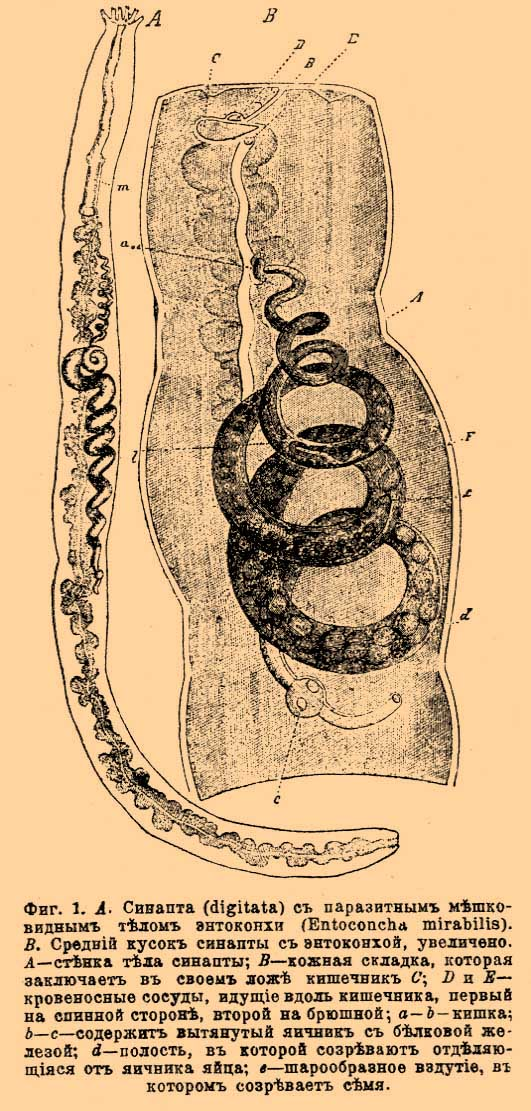
- Entoconcha mirabilis within Oestergrenia digitata

Scientific classification
- Kingdom: Animalia
- Phylum: Mollusca
- Class: Gastropoda
- Subclass: Caenogastropoda
- Order: Littorinimorpha
- Family: Eulimidae
- Genus: Entoconcha
- Species: E. mirabilis

Binomial name
- Entoconcha mirabilis J. Müller, 1852

Synonyms
- Entoconcha parasita Baur, 1864; Helicosyrinx parasita Baur, 1864

= Entoconcha mirabilis =

Species of gastropod

Entoconcha mirabilis is a species of very small parasitic sea snail, a marine gastropod mollusk in the family Eulimidae. This species is the only one known to exist within the genus, Entoconcha. The species is parasitic on holothuroidea, sea cucumbers. As an adult it resembles a worm and has no shell.

== Distribution ==
This species occurs in the following locations:

- European waters (ERMS scope)
