= Auriculigerina miranda =

- A shell of Auriculigerina miranda, photographed by Andrea Nappo

Scientific classification
- Kingdom: Animalia
- Phylum: Mollusca
- Class: Gastropoda
- Subclass: Caenogastropoda
- Order: Littorinimorpha
- Family: Eulimidae
- Genus: Auriculigerina
- Species: A. ciranda

Binomial name
- Auriculigerina ciranda Dautzenberg, 1925

Species of gastropod

Auriculigerina miranda is a species of sea snail, a marine gastropod mollusk in the family Eulimidae. The species is the only known species within the genus Auriculigerina.

== Distribution ==
This species occurs in the following locations:

- European waters (ERMS scope)
