= Clypeastericola clypeastericola =

Scientific classification
- Kingdom: Animalia
- Phylum: Mollusca
- Class: Gastropoda
- Subclass: Caenogastropoda
- Order: Littorinimorpha
- Family: Eulimidae
- Genus: Clypeastericola
- Species: C. clypeastericola

Binomial name
- Clypeastericola clypeastericola Habe, 1976

Synonyms
- Balcis clypeastericola Habe, 1976; Melanella clypeastericola (Habe, 1976)

Species of gastropod

Clypeastericola clypeastericola is a species of sea snail, a marine gastropod mollusk in the family Eulimidae. This species is one of two known species to exist within the genus, Clypeastericola, the other species is known as Clypeastericola natalensis.

== Distribution ==
This species occurs in the following locations:

- Sea of Japan
