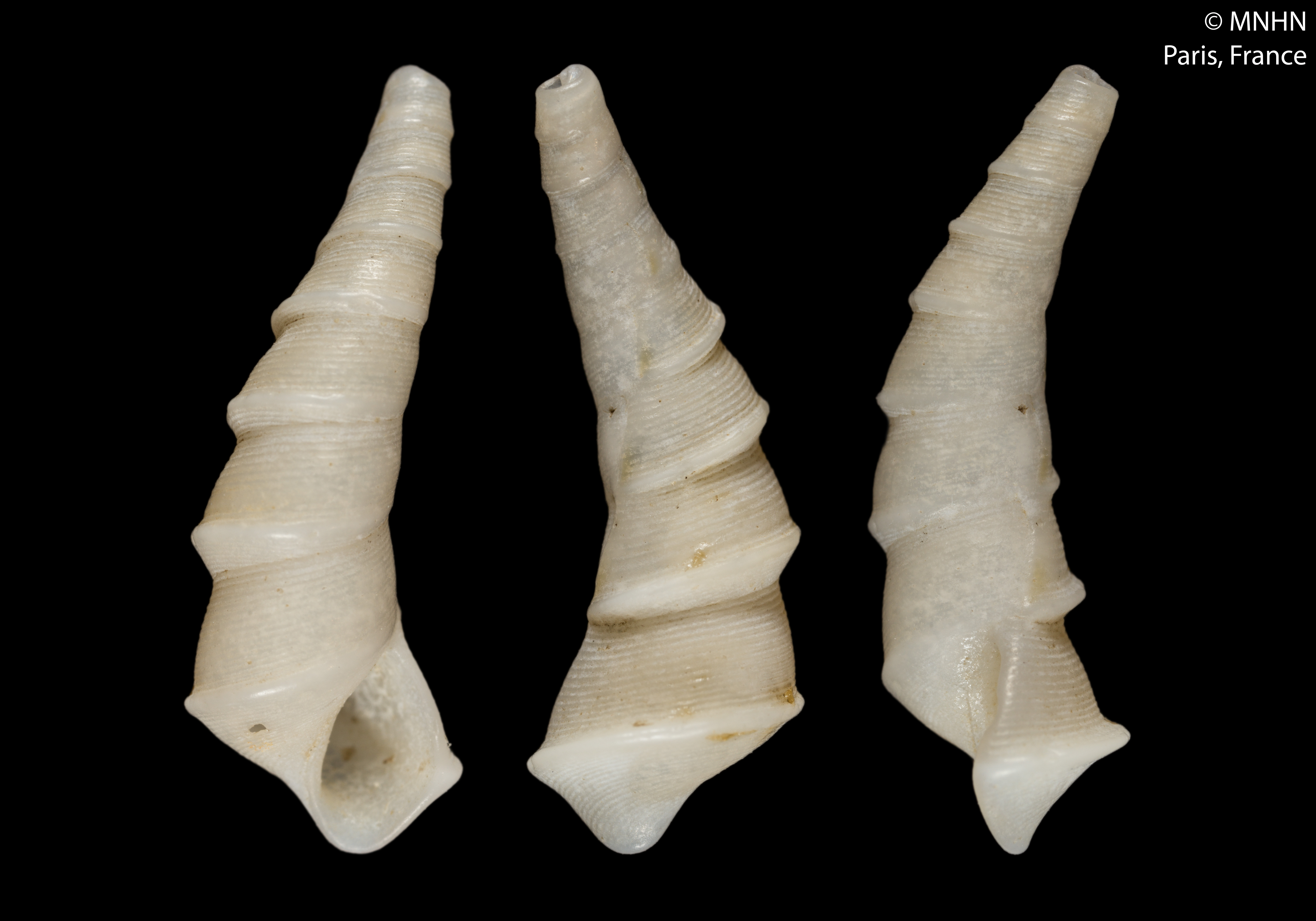
- Shell of Bacula striolata (specimen at MNHN, Paris)

Scientific classification
- Kingdom: Animalia
- Phylum: Mollusca
- Class: Gastropoda
- Subclass: Caenogastropoda
- Order: Littorinimorpha
- Family: Eulimidae
- Genus: Bacula
- Species: B. striolata

Binomial name
- Bacula striolata H. Adams & A. Adams, 1863

Synonyms
- Bacula lamberti (Souverbie, 1875); Subeulima lamberti Souverbie, 1875

= Bacula striolata =

Species of gastropod

Bacula striolata is a species of sea snail, a marine gastropod mollusc in the family Eulimidae. The species is one of three known species within the genus Bacula, the other two being Bacula lamberti and Bacula morisyuichiroi.

== Description ==
(Original description in Latin) The shell is awl‑shaped and club‑like, without an umbilicus. It is a dull, dirty white in colour. Its entire surface is marked by transverse striae. It consists of about twelve whorls, which are flattened; the body whorl is only very slightly angled at the periphery.

The aperture is acuminate‑ovate, tapering to a point. The inner lip is arched and thickened, while the outer lip is slightly produced in its middle portion.
