= Asterophila perknasteri =

Scientific classification
- Kingdom: Animalia
- Phylum: Mollusca
- Class: Gastropoda
- Subclass: Caenogastropoda
- Order: Littorinimorpha
- Family: Eulimidae
- Genus: Asterophila
- Species: A. perknasteri

Binomial name
- Asterophila perknasteri Warén, in Warén & Lewis, 1994

Species of gastropod

Asterophila perknasteri is a species of sea snail, a marine gastropod mollusk in the family Eulimidae. The species is one of three known species within the genus Asterophila; the other congeneric species are Asterophila japonica and Asterophila rathbunasteri.

== Distribution ==
This marine species is mainly distributed near the Antarctic Circle and can be found within the Scotia Sea.
