= Asterophila =

Scientific classification
- Kingdom: Animalia
- Phylum: Mollusca
- Class: Gastropoda
- Subclass: Caenogastropoda
- Order: Littorinimorpha
- Family: Eulimidae
- Genus: Asterophila; Randall & Heath, 1912

Type species
- Asterophila japonica Randall & Heath, 1912

Genus of molluscs

Asterophila is a genus of medium-sized sea snails, marine gastropod mollusks in the family Eulimidae.

== Species ==
There are three known species within the Asterophila genus of gastropods. These include the following:

- Asterophila japonica (Randall & Heath, 1912)
- Asterophila perknasteri (Warén, in Warén & Lewis, 1994)
- Asterophila rathbunasteri (Warén, in Warén & Lewis, 1994)
