= Robillardia =

Scientific classification
- Kingdom: Animalia
- Phylum: Mollusca
- Class: Gastropoda
- Subclass: Caenogastropoda
- Order: Littorinimorpha
- Family: Eulimidae
- Genus: Robillardia; E. A. Smith, 1889

Type species
- Robillardia cernica E. A. Smith, 1889

Synonyms
- Luetzenia Rehder, 1980

Genus of gastropods

Robillardia is a genus of very small ectoparasitic sea snails, marine gastropod mollusks or micromollusks in the Eulimidae family. This genus was described by Edgar Albert Smith in 1889.

== Species ==
Species within the genera Robillardia include:

- Robillardia cernica E. A. Smith, 1889 (Type taxon)
- Robillardia pisum Habe, 1953
- Robillardia solida Warén, 1980
