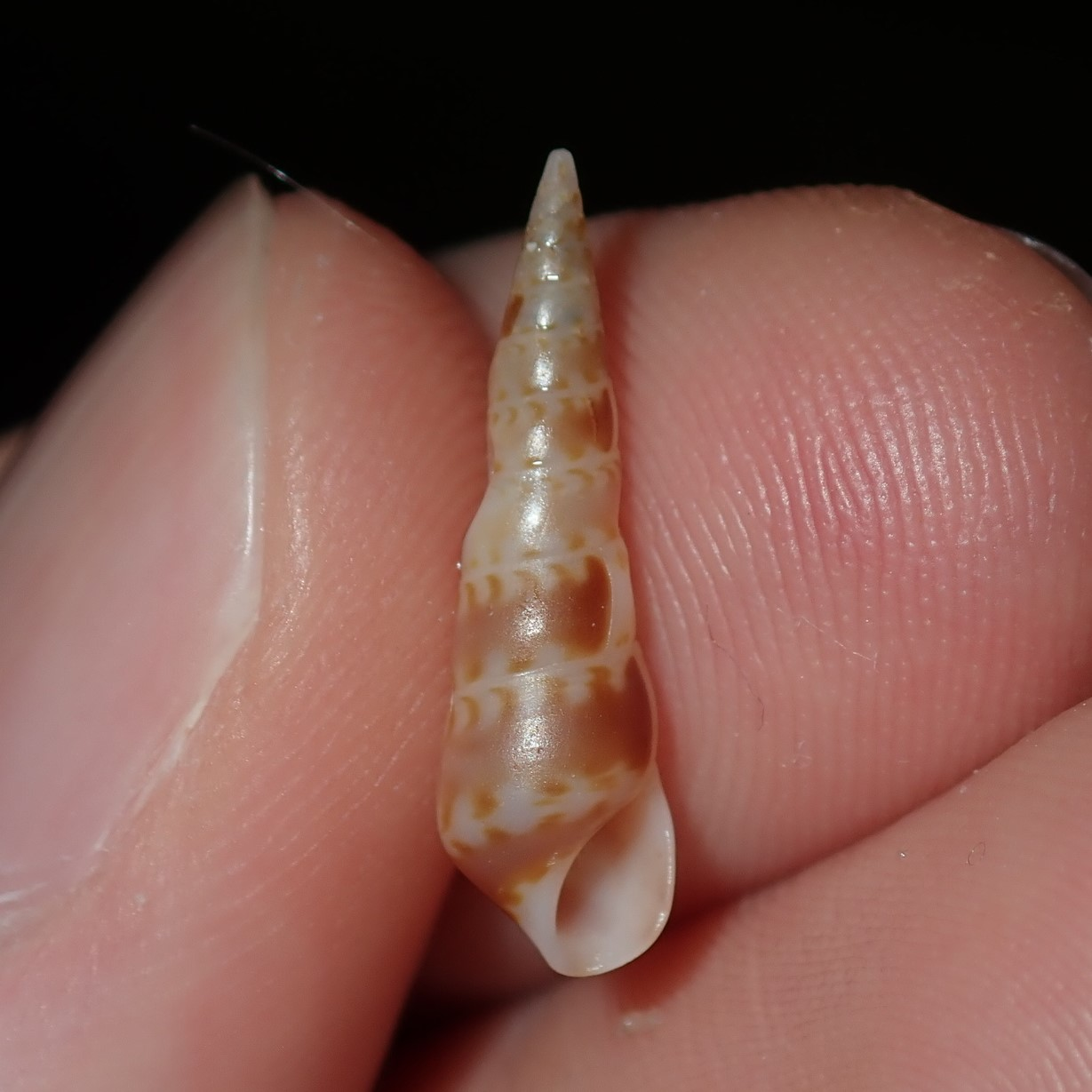

Scientific classification
- Kingdom: Animalia
- Phylum: Mollusca
- Class: Gastropoda
- Subclass: Caenogastropoda
- Order: Littorinimorpha
- Family: Eulimidae
- Genus: Pictobalcis; Laseron, 1955
- Species: P. articulata

Binomial name
- Pictobalcis articulata G. B. Sowerby I, 1834

Synonyms
- Eulima articulata G. B. Sowerby I, 1834

= Pictobalcis =

Pictobalcis articulata

Monotypic genus of sea snails

Pictobalcis is a monotypic genus of sea snails in the family Eulimidae. As of 2025, the only known species is P. articulata.

== Description ==
Pictobalcis articulata is the largest eulimid occurring in its range, with a high turretellid-like polished shell patterned in wavy vertical lines of chestnut brown or dark red on a background of cream to dark red, up to 26mm in length. Unlike other eulimids this species is coastal, from low intertidal down to 30 metres deep. The animal is ectoparasitic like other genera in the family, but due to its rarity it has not been studied and the host or hosts it depends on are not known. Empty shells are washed into tide pools or found inhabited by hermit crabs.

== Distribution ==
Occurs in Australia off New South Wales, South Australia and Victoria, also the north-eastern coast of the North Island and the Kermadec Islands, New Zealand, and Norfolk Island. Has been reported from Japan and the Philippines, and empty shells have been reportedly found in New Caledonia.
