= Ophiolamia =

Scientific classification
- Kingdom: Animalia
- Phylum: Mollusca
- Class: Gastropoda
- Subclass: Caenogastropoda
- Order: Littorinimorpha
- Family: Eulimidae
- Genus: Ophiolamia; Warén & Carney, 1981

Type species
- Ophiolamia armigeri Warén & Carney, 1981

Genus of gastropods

Ophiolamia is a genus of parasitic sea snails, marine gastropod mollusks in the family Eulimidae.

== Species ==
- Ophiolamia armigeri Warén & Carney, 1981
- Ophiolamia fragilissima Bouchet & Warén, 1986
