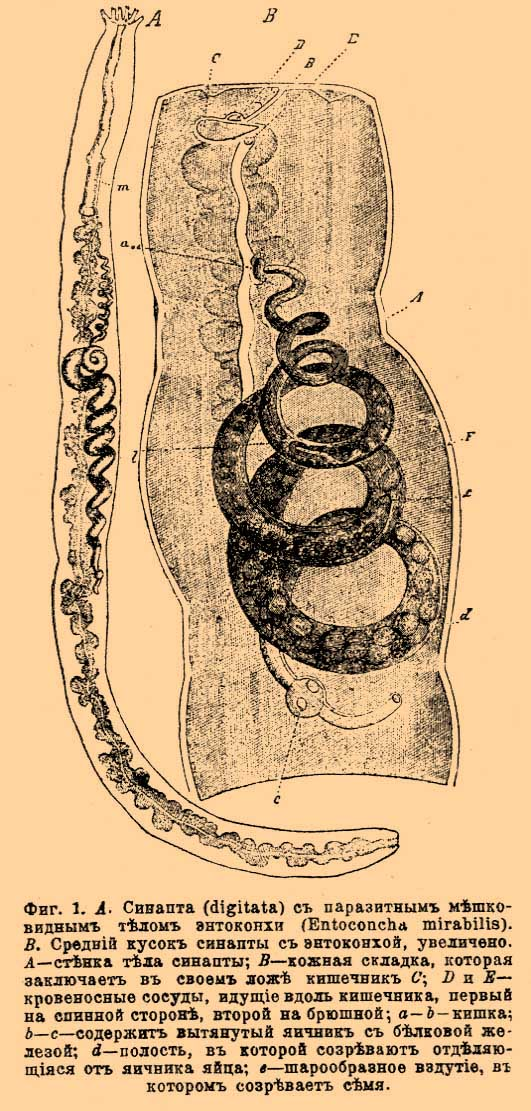
- Entoconcha mirabilis within Oestergrenia digitata

Scientific classification
- Domain: Eukaryota
- Kingdom: Animalia
- Phylum: Mollusca
- Class: Gastropoda
- Subclass: Caenogastropoda
- Order: Littorinimorpha
- Family: Eulimidae
- Genus: Entoconcha; J. Müller, 1852

= Entoconcha =

Genus of gastropods

Entoconcha is a genus of very small parasitic sea snails, marine gastropod mollusks in the family Eulimidae.

These small snails live in the perivisceral coelom of sea cucumbers.

== Species ==
Species within this genus include the following:

- Entoconcha mirabilis (J. Mueller, 1852)

Species brought into synonymy

- Entoconcha muelleri (Semper, 1868): synonym of Enteroxenos muelleri (Semper, 1868)
- Entoconcha parasita (Baur, 1864): synonym of Entoconcha mirabilis (J. Mueller, 1852)
