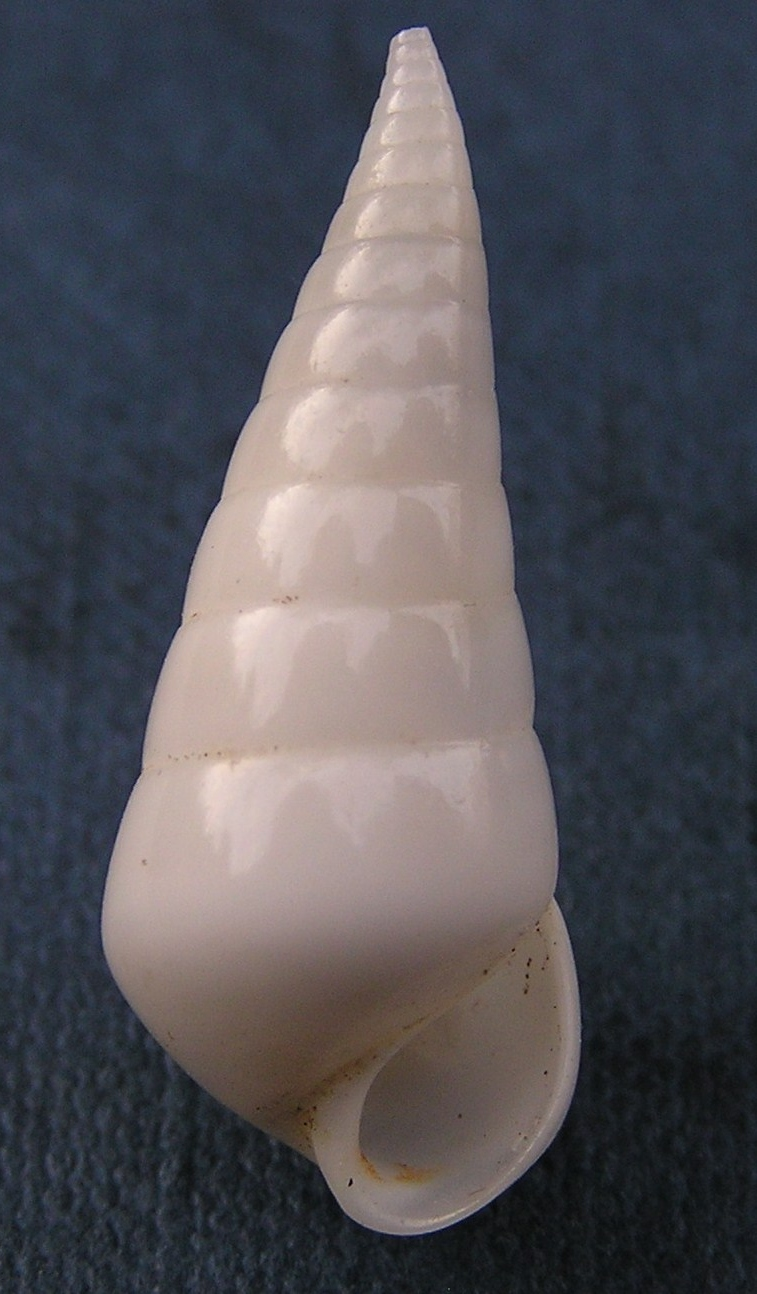
- Shell of Melanella candida

Scientific classification
- Kingdom: Animalia
- Phylum: Mollusca
- Class: Gastropoda
- Subclass: Caenogastropoda
- Order: Littorinimorpha
- Family: Eulimidae
- Genus: Melanella
- Species: M. candida

Binomial name
- Melanella candida (Marrat, 1880)

Synonyms
- Eulima candida Marrat, 1880 ·

= Melanella candida =

Species of gastropod

Melanella candida is a species of sea snail, a marine gastropod mollusk in the family Eulimidae. The species is one of a number within the genus Melanella.

== Distribution ==
This marine species occurs off the Philippines and Japan.
