= Campylorhaphion =

Scientific classification
- Kingdom: Animalia
- Phylum: Mollusca
- Class: Gastropoda
- Subclass: Caenogastropoda
- Order: Littorinimorpha
- Superfamily: Vanikoroidea
- Family: Eulimidae
- Genus: Campylorhaphion; Bouchet & Warén, 1986

Type species
- Eulima famelica Watson, 1883

Genus of gastropods

Campylorhaphion is a genus of sea snails, marine gastropod mollusks in the family Eulimidae.

== Species ==
There are only two known species within this genus, these include the following:

- Campylorhaphion famelicum (Watson, 1883)
- Campylorhaphion flexum (A. Adams, 1861)
- Campylorhaphion machaeropse (Dautzenberg & Fischer H., 1896)
