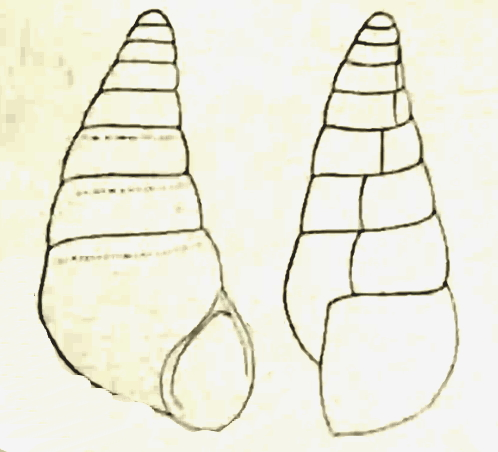
- Shell of Melanella bryani (original image)

Scientific classification
- Kingdom: Animalia
- Phylum: Mollusca
- Class: Gastropoda
- Subclass: Caenogastropoda
- Order: Littorinimorpha
- Family: Eulimidae
- Genus: Melanella
- Species: M. bryani

Binomial name
- Melanella bryani Pilsbry, 1918

Synonyms
- Balcis bryani (Pilsbry, 1918) · unaccepted (Balcis is considered a junior synonym of Melanella); Parvioris bryani (Pilsbry, 1918)

= Melanella bryani =

Species of gastropod

Melanella bryani is a species of sea snail, a marine gastropod mollusk in the family Eulimidae. The species is one of many species known to exist within the genus, Melanella.

== Description ==
The length of the shell attains 10 mm, its diameter 5 mm.

(Original description) The shell is obliquely conic, with the upper half rather strongly curved to the right and backward. It is smooth and white, while the later whorls have a broad gray border below the suture, which is somewhat impressed. A single series of well-impressed linear varices runs up the right side, receding to a dorsal position in the upper whorls. The whorls are slightly convex. The aperture is small and subvertical. The columella is deeply concave, and the parietal wall is rather heavily calloused. In profile view, the outer lip is almost straight and does not arch forward

== Distribution ==
This marine species occurs off Hawaii.
