= Concavibalcis =

Scientific classification
- Kingdom: Animalia
- Phylum: Mollusca
- Class: Gastropoda
- Subclass: Caenogastropoda
- Order: Littorinimorpha
- Superfamily: Vanikoroidea
- Family: Eulimidae
- Genus: Concavibalcis; Warén, 1980

Type species
- Concavibalcis scalaris Warén, 1980

Genus of gastropods

Concavibalcis is a genus of sea snails, marine gastropod mollusks in the family Eulimidae.

== Species ==
This includes the following:

- Concavibalcis haterumaensis Takano, Tsuzuki & Kano, 2022
- Concavibalcis scalaris (Warén, 1980)
