= Punctifera =

Scientific classification
- Kingdom: Animalia
- Phylum: Mollusca
- Class: Gastropoda
- Subclass: Caenogastropoda
- Order: Littorinimorpha
- Family: Eulimidae
- Genus: Punctifera; Warén, 1981

Type species
- Punctifera ophiomoerae Warén, 1981

Genus of gastropods

Punctifera is a genus of very small ectoparasitic sea snails, marine gastropod mollusks or micromollusks in the family Eulimidae.

== Species ==
Species within the genera Punctifera include:

- Punctifera ophiomoerae Warén, 1981
