= Pisolamia =

Scientific classification
- Kingdom: Animalia
- Phylum: Mollusca
- Class: Gastropoda
- Subclass: Caenogastropoda
- Order: Littorinimorpha
- Family: Eulimidae
- Genus: Pisolamia; Bouchet & Lützen, 1976

Type species
- Stilifer brychius Watson, 1883

Genus of gastropods

Pisolamia is a genus of very small ectoparasitic sea snails, marine gastropod mollusks or micromollusks in the family Eulimidae.

== Species ==
Species within the genera Pisolamia include:

- Pisolamia brychia (Watson, 1883)

Species brought into synonymy

- Pisolamia abyssorum (P. Fischer MS, Locard, 1897): synonym of Pisolamia brychia (Watson, 1883)
