= Turveria =

Scientific classification
- Kingdom: Animalia
- Phylum: Mollusca
- Class: Gastropoda
- Subclass: Caenogastropoda
- Order: Littorinimorpha
- Family: Eulimidae
- Genus: Turveria; Berry, 1956

Genus of gastropods

Turveria is a genus of very small ectoparasitic sea snails, marine gastropod mollusks or micromollusks in the Eulimidae family.

== Species ==
Species within the genus Turveriainclude :

- Turveria encopendema Berry, 1956
- Turveria pallida Warén, 1992
- Turveria schwengelae (Bartsch, 1938)
