= Rectilabrum =

Scientific classification
- Kingdom: Animalia
- Phylum: Mollusca
- Class: Gastropoda
- Subclass: Caenogastropoda
- Order: Littorinimorpha
- Family: Eulimidae
- Genus: Rectilabrum; Bouchet & Warén, 1986

Type species
- Rectilabrum lanceolatum Bouchet & Warén, 1986

Genus of gastropods

Rectilabrum is a genus of ectoparasitic sea snails, marine gastropod mollusks in the family Eulimidae.

== Species ==
- Rectilabrum lanceolatum Bouchet & Warén, 1986
