= Prostilifer =

Scientific classification
- Kingdom: Animalia
- Phylum: Mollusca
- Class: Gastropoda
- Subclass: Caenogastropoda
- Order: Littorinimorpha
- Family: Eulimidae
- Genus: Prostilifer; Warén, 1980

Type species
- Eulima subpellucida Pease, 1865

Genus of gastropods

Prostilifer is a genus of very small ectoparasitic sea snails, marine gastropod mollusks or micromollusks in the family Eulimidae.

== Distribution ==
This marine genus is endemic to Australia and occurs off Queensland.

== Species ==
Species within the genera Prostilifer include:

- Prostilifer subpellucida (Pease, 1865)
