= Ophioarachnicola =

Scientific classification
- Kingdom: Animalia
- Phylum: Mollusca
- Class: Gastropoda
- Subclass: Caenogastropoda
- Order: Littorinimorpha
- Family: Eulimidae
- Genus: Ophioarachnicola; Warén, 1980

Type species
- Ophioarachnicola biformis Warén, 1980

Genus of gastropods

Ophioarachnicola is a genus of parasitic sea snails, marine gastropod mollusks in the family Eulimidae.

== Species ==
- Ophioarachnicola biformis Warén, 1980
