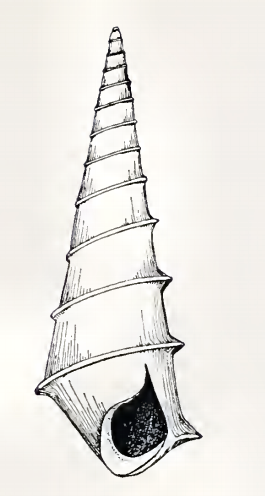
- Shell of Subniso rangii

Scientific classification
- Kingdom: Animalia
- Phylum: Mollusca
- Class: Gastropoda
- Subclass: Caenogastropoda
- Order: Littorinimorpha
- Family: Eulimidae
- Genus: Subniso
- Species: S. rangii

Binomial name
- Subniso rangii (de Folin, 1867)

Synonyms
- Chemnitzia rangii de Folin, 1867 (original combination); Niso babylonica (Bartsch, 1912) junior subjective synonym; Niso rangii (de Folin, 1867) superseded combination; Odostomia (Scalenostoma) babylonica Bartsch, 1912 junior subjective synonym; Odostomia (Scalenostoma) rangii Dall and Bartsch, 1909

= Subniso rangii =

Species of gastropod

Subniso rangii is a species of sea snail, a marine gastropod mollusk in the family Eulimidae.

== Description ==
The length of the shell attains 3.1 mm, its diameter 1.2 mm.

(Described as Scalenostoma rangii) The shell is imperforate and elongate-conic. The apex is rather obtuse and light-colored. The 12 whorls are smooth. The earlier whorls are normal, increasing regularly in diameter; the altitude of the body whorl is one-third that of the entire shell. The suture is simple above, but afterwards it is keeled by the preceding whorl. The aperture is quadrate; the margins are simple, and the left lip is somewhat reflected.

The shell is somewhat elongate and yellowish in color, tending a little toward brown. The apex is rather obtuse. The spire is made up of 12 whorls, all of which are smooth. The sides of the early whorls are almost straight, making this part of the shell regularly conic. The four or five later whorls differ from the first ones anteriorly in that they escape from the profile of the cone and widen on a plane with the base, thus forming a prominent keel which is very thin and almost sharp-edged upon the periphery. This expansion of the base follows the whorls of the spire, increasing in prominence as they increase in diameter. Thus, the keel terminates on the right margin of the aperture. The suture is extremely narrow, and on the whorls furnished with the keel that we have just described, it occurs in front of the keel, between the keel and the succeeding whorl. The aperture is almost quadrate; the margins are simple, and the left margin is slightly reflected upon the columella.

== Distribution ==
The species occurs off Mexico, Costa Rica, Panama and Ecuador.
