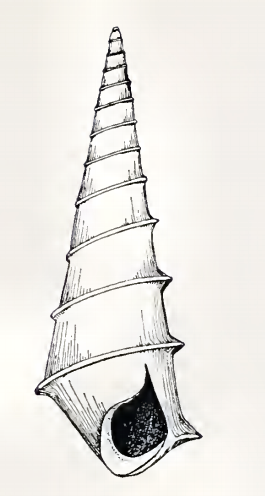
- Shell of Subniso rangii

Scientific classification
- Kingdom: Animalia
- Phylum: Mollusca
- Class: Gastropoda
- Subclass: Caenogastropoda
- Order: Littorinimorpha
- Family: Eulimidae
- Genus: Subniso; McLean, 2000

Type species
- Chemnitzia rangii de Folin, 1867

= Subniso =

Genus of gastropods

Subniso is a genus of very small ectoparasitic sea snails, marine gastropod mollusks or micromollusks in the Eulimidae family.

== Species ==
Species within the genus Subniso :

- Subniso hipolitensis (Bartsch, 1917)
- Subniso osorioae Raines, 2003
- Subniso rangii (de Folin, 1867)
