= Clypeastericola =

Scientific classification
- Kingdom: Animalia
- Phylum: Mollusca
- Class: Gastropoda
- Subclass: Caenogastropoda
- Order: Littorinimorpha
- Family: Eulimidae
- Genus: Clypeastericola; Warén, 1994

Type species
- Balcis clypeastericola Habe, 1976

Genus of gastropods

Clypeastericola is a genus of medium-sized sea snails, marine gastropod mollusks in the family Eulimidae.

== Species ==
There are two known species to exist within the genus Clypeastericola, these include the following:

- Clypeastericola clypeastericola (Habe, 1976)
- Clypeastericola natalensis (Warén, 1994)
