= Arcuella =

Scientific classification
- Kingdom: Animalia
- Phylum: Mollusca
- Class: Gastropoda
- Subclass: Caenogastropoda
- Order: Littorinimorpha
- Family: Eulimidae
- Genus: Arcuella; G. Nevill & H. Nevill, 1874

Type species
- Arcuella mirifica G. Nevill & H. Nevill, 1874

Genus of gastropods

Arcuella is a genus of medium-sized sea snails, marine gastropod mollusks in the family Eulimidae.

== Species ==
There is currently only one known species within this genus of gastropods:

- Arcuella mirifica (G. Nevill & H. Nevill, 1874)
