= Echiuroidicola =

Scientific classification
- Kingdom: Animalia
- Phylum: Mollusca
- Class: Gastropoda
- Subclass: Caenogastropoda
- Order: Littorinimorpha
- Family: Eulimidae
- Genus: Echiuroidicola; Warén, 1980

Type species
- Echiuroidicola cicatricosa Warén, 1980

Genus of gastropods

Bacula is a genus of sea snails, marine gastropod mollusks in the family Eulimidae.

== Species ==
Species within this genus include the following:

- Echiuroidicola cicatricosa (Warén, 1980)
