= Paramegadenus =

Scientific classification
- Kingdom: Animalia
- Phylum: Mollusca
- Class: Gastropoda
- Subclass: Caenogastropoda
- Order: Littorinimorpha
- Family: Eulimidae
- Genus: Paramegadenus; Humphreys & Lützen, 1972

Type species
- Megadenus arrhynchus Ivanov, 1937

Genus of gastropods

Paramegadenus is a genus of parasitic sea snails, marine gastropod mollusks in the family Eulimidae.

== Distribution ==
This marine genus is endemic to Australia and occurs off Queensland

== Species ==
- Paramegadenus arrhynchus (Ivanov, 1937)
- Paramegadenus incerta Warén, 1980
- Paramegadenus scutellicola Warén, 1980
