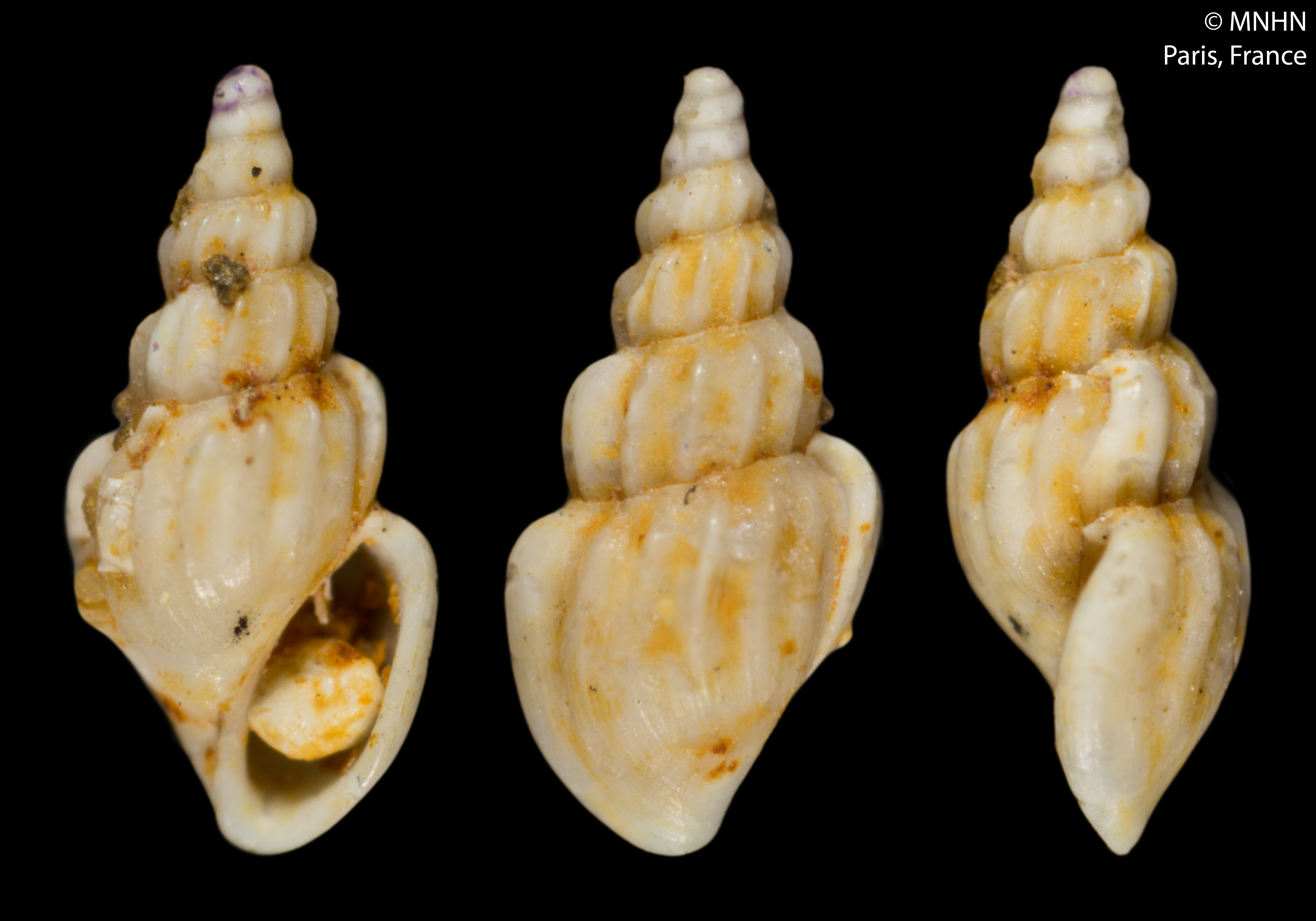
- Shell of † Palisadia dockeryi (holotype at MNHN, Paris)

Scientific classification
- Kingdom: Animalia
- Phylum: Mollusca
- Class: Gastropoda
- Subclass: Caenogastropoda
- Order: Littorinimorpha
- Superfamily: Vanikoroidea
- Family: Eulimidae
- Genus: Palisadia; Laseron, 1956

Type species
- Palisadia subulata Laseron, 1956

= Palisadia =

Genus of gastropods

Palisadia is a genus of parasitic sea snails, marine gastropod mollusks in the family Eulimidae.

== Distribution ==
This marine genus occurs in the Red Sea and off Christmas Island.

== Species ==
- † Palisadia dockeryi Lozouet, 1999
- Palisadia rittneri Mienis, 2017
- Palisadia subulata Laseron, 1956
