= Selma (gastropod) =

Scientific classification
- Kingdom: Animalia
- Phylum: Mollusca
- Class: Gastropoda
- Subclass: Caenogastropoda
- Order: Littorinimorpha
- Family: Eulimidae
- Genus: Selma; A. Adams, 1863

Genus of gastropods

Selma is a genus of very small ectoparasitic sea snails, marine gastropod mollusks or micromollusks in the Eulimidae family.

== Species ==
Species within the genera Selma include:

- Selma succiniola A. Adams, 1863
