= Pulicicochlea =

Scientific classification
- Kingdom: Animalia
- Phylum: Mollusca
- Class: Gastropoda
- Subclass: Caenogastropoda
- Order: Littorinimorpha
- Family: Eulimidae
- Genus: Pulicicochlea; Ponder & Gooding, 1978

Type species
- Pulicicochlea calamaris Ponder & Gooding, 1978

Synonyms
- Pulicicochlea (Pseudoretusa) Ponder & Gooding, 1978; Pulicicochlea (Pulicicochlea) Ponder & Gooding, 1978

Genus of gastropods

Pulicicochlea is a genus of very small ectoparasitic sea snails, marine gastropod mollusks or micromollusks in the family Eulimidae.

== Distribution ==
This marine genus occurs in the Western Pacific and off Australia (Queensland).

== Species ==
Species within the genera Pulicicochlea include:

- Pulicicochlea astropyga Ponder & Gooding, 1978
- Pulicicochlea calamaris Ponder & Gooding, 1978
- Pulicicochlea faba Ponder & Gooding, 1978
- Pulicicochlea fusca Ponder & Gooding, 1978
