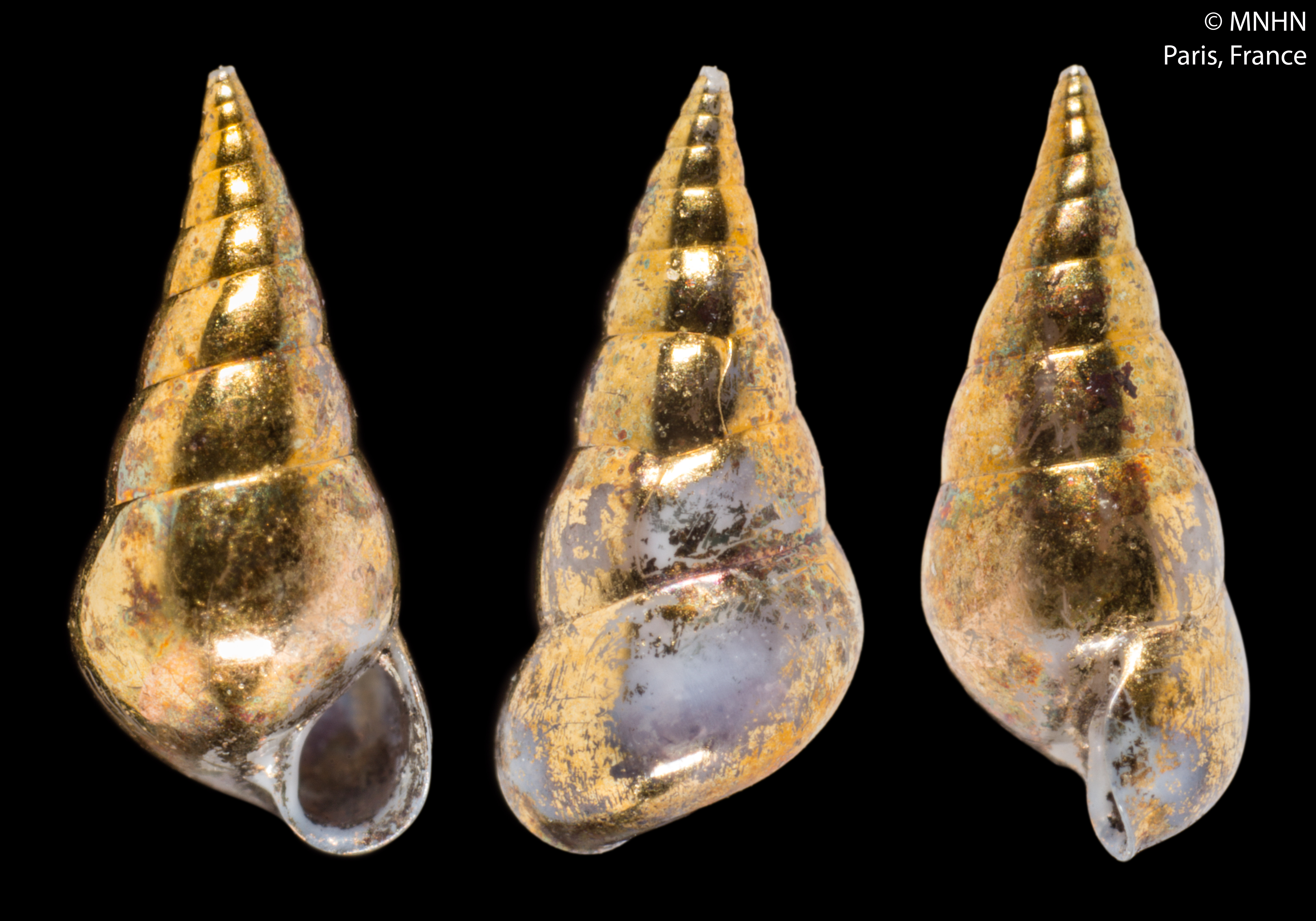
- Shell of Nanobalcis cherbonnieri (holotype at MNHN, Paris)

Scientific classification
- Kingdom: Animalia
- Phylum: Mollusca
- Class: Gastropoda
- Subclass: Caenogastropoda
- Order: Littorinimorpha
- Superfamily: Vanikoroidea
- Family: Eulimidae
- Genus: Nanobalcis; Dall, 1919

Type species
- Eulima nana Monterosato, 1878

Synonyms
- Warén & Mifsud, 1990

= Nanobalcis =

Genus of gastropods

Nanobalcis is a genus of minute sea snails, marine gastropod mollusks in the family Eulimidae.

== Species ==
- Nanobalcis cherbonnieri Warén, 1990
- Nanobalcis nana (Monterosato, 1878)
- Nanobalcis worsfoldi Warén, 1990

Species brought into synonymy

- Nanobalcis chondrocidaricola (Warén, B. L. Burch & T. A. Burch, 1984): synonym of Vitreolina chondrocidaricola Warén, B. L. Burch & T. A. Burch, 1984
- Nanobalcis hawaiiensis (Warén, B. L. Burch & T. A. Burch, 1984): synonym of Vitreolina hawaiiensis Warén, B. L. Burch & T. A. Burch, 1984
