= Monogamus =

Scientific classification
- Kingdom: Animalia
- Phylum: Mollusca
- Class: Gastropoda
- Subclass: Caenogastropoda
- Order: Littorinimorpha
- Family: Eulimidae
- Genus: Monogamus; Lützen, 1976

Type species
- Monogamus entopodia Lützen, 1976

Genus of gastropods

Monogamus is a genus of small sea snails, marine gastropod mollusks in the family Eulimidae.

== Species ==
- Monogamus barroni (A. Adams, 1854)
- Monogamus entopodia Lützen, 1976
- Monogamus interspinea Lützen, 1976
- Monogamus minibulla (Olsson & McGinty, 1958)
- Monogamus parasaleniae Warén, 1980
