= Vitreobalcis =

Scientific classification
- Kingdom: Animalia
- Phylum: Mollusca
- Class: Gastropoda
- Subclass: Caenogastropoda
- Order: Littorinimorpha
- Family: Eulimidae
- Genus: Vitreobalcis; Warén, 1980

Type species
- Apicalia holdsworthi H. Adams, 1874

Genus of gastropods

Vitreobalcis is a genus of very small ectoparasitic sea snails, marine gastropod mollusks or micromollusks in the Eulimidae family.

== Species ==
Species within the genus Vitreobalcisinclude :

- Vitreobalcis holdsworthi (H. Adams, 1874)
- Vitreobalcis laevis Warén, 1980
- Vitreobalcis nutans (Mühlfeld, 1824)
