= Diacolax =

Scientific classification
- Kingdom: Animalia
- Phylum: Mollusca
- Class: Gastropoda
- Subclass: Caenogastropoda
- Order: Littorinimorpha
- Family: Eulimidae
- Genus: Diacolax; Mandahl-Barth, 1946

Genus of gastropods

Diacolax is a genus of medium-sized sea snails, marine gastropod mollusks in the family Eulimidae.

== Species ==
There is only one known species to exist within this genus, this includes the following:

- Diacolax cucumariae (Mandahl-Barth, 1946)
