= Campylorhaphion machaeropse =

Scientific classification
- Kingdom: Animalia
- Phylum: Mollusca
- Class: Gastropoda
- Subclass: Caenogastropoda
- Order: Littorinimorpha
- Family: Eulimidae
- Genus: Campylorhaphion
- Species: C. machaeropse

Binomial name
- Campylorhaphion machaeropse Dautzenberg & Fischer H., 1896

Synonyms
- Eulima machaeropse Dautzenberg & Fischer H., 1896

Species of gastropod

Campylorhaphion machaeropse is a species of sea snail, a marine gastropod, in the family Eulimidae.

== Distribution ==
This species is distributed in the following locations:

- European waters (ERMS scope)
