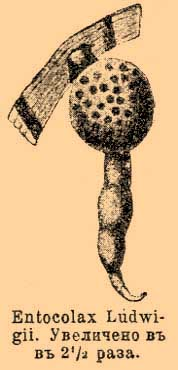

Scientific classification
- Kingdom: Animalia
- Phylum: Mollusca
- Class: Gastropoda
- Subclass: Caenogastropoda
- Order: Littorinimorpha
- Family: Eulimidae
- Genus: Entocolax; Voigt, 1888

Type species
- Entocolax ludwigi Voigt, 1888

= Entocolax =

Genus of gastropods

Entocolax is a genus of sea snails, marine gastropod mollusks in the family Eulimidae.

== Species ==
Species within this genus include:

- Entocolax chiridotae Scarlato, 1951
- Entocolax ludwigii Voigt, 1888
- Entocolax rimskykorsakovi Ivanov, 1945
- Entocolax schiemenzi Voigt, 1901
- Entocolax schwanitschi Heding in Heding & Mandahl-Barth, 1938
- Entocolax trochodotae Heding, 1934

Species brought into synonymy

- Entocolax ludwigi Voigt, 1888: synonym of Entocolax ludwigii Voigt, 1888
