= Molpadicola =

Scientific classification
- Kingdom: Animalia
- Phylum: Mollusca
- Class: Gastropoda
- Subclass: Caenogastropoda
- Order: Littorinimorpha
- Family: Eulimidae
- Genus: Molpadicola; Grusov, 1957

Genus of gastropods

Molpadicola is a genus of small sea snails, marine gastropod mollusks in the family Eulimidae.

== Species ==
There is only one known species within this genus:

- Molpadicola orientalis Grusov, 1957
