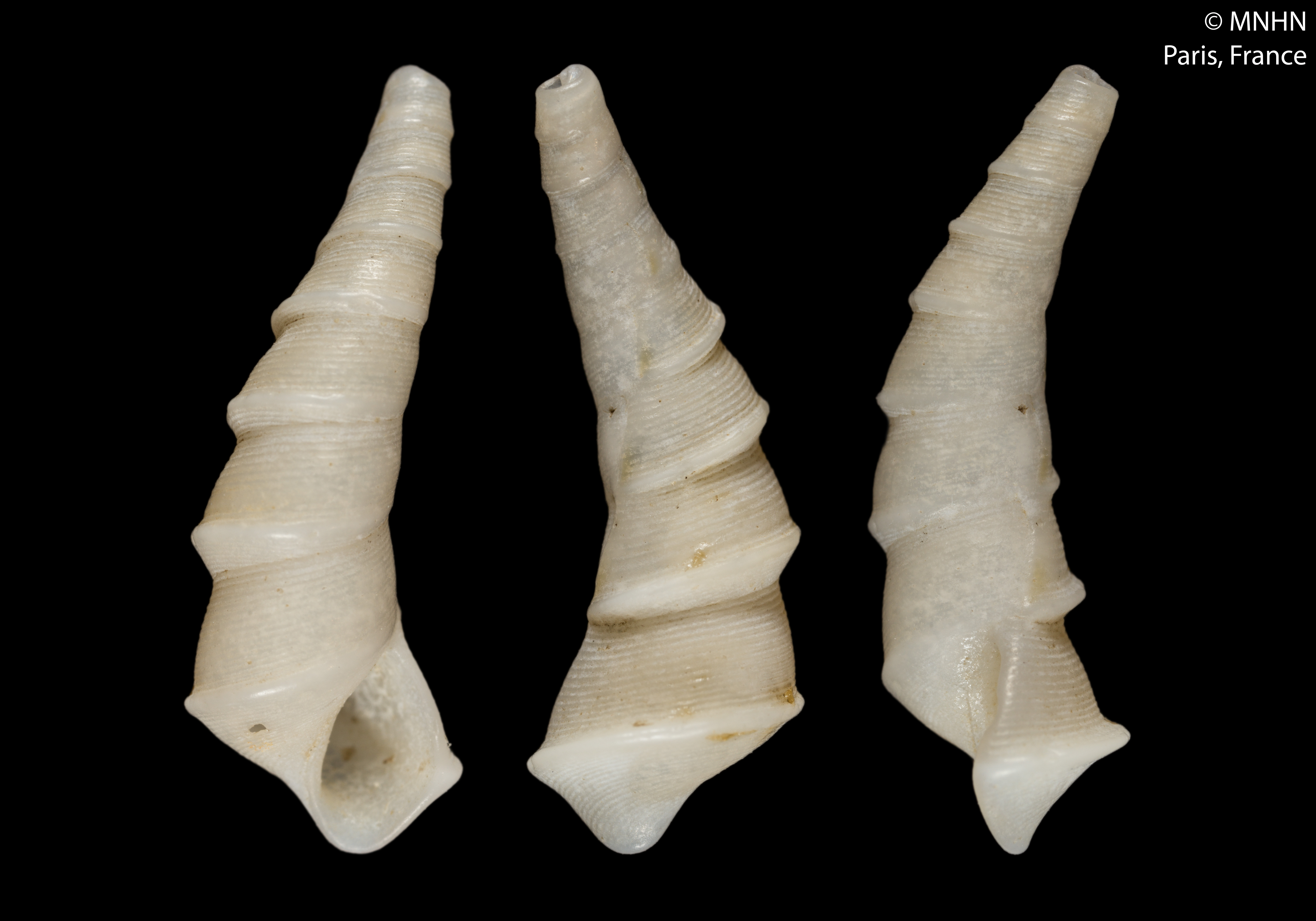
- Shell of Bacula striolata

Scientific classification
- Kingdom: Animalia
- Phylum: Mollusca
- Class: Gastropoda
- Subclass: Caenogastropoda
- Order: Littorinimorpha
- Superfamily: Vanikoroidea
- Family: Eulimidae
- Genus: Bacula; H. Adams & A. Adams, 1863

Type species
- Bacula striolata H. Adams & A. Adams, 1863

Synonyms
- Subeulima Souverbie, 1875

= Bacula (gastropod) =

Genus of gastropods

Bacula is a genus of medium-sized sea snails, marine gastropod molluscs in the family Eulimidae.

== General characteristics ==
(Original description in Latin) The shell is awl‑shaped and club‑like, without an umbilicus. It is twisted and solid, and the entire surface is marked by transverse striae. The aperture is ovate, entire anteriorly, and somewhat produced forward. The inner lip is thickened and callous, while the outer lip is simple, with a sharp margin that is slightly produced in its middle part.

In its subulate form and tortuosity this little genus resembles Eulima, all the species of which, however, are glabrous or polished. In Bacula the whorls are transversely striated, and the inner lip is circumscribed and callous.

== Species ==
There are three known species within the genus Bacula:

- Bacula kajiyamai (T. Habe, 1961)
- Bacula morisyuichiroi (T. Habe, 1968)
- Bacula striolata H. Adams & A. Adams, 1863

Synonyms

- Bacula lamberti (Souverbie, 1875): synonym of Bacula striolata H. Adams & A. Adams, 1863
