= Parastilbe =

Scientific classification
- Kingdom: Animalia
- Phylum: Mollusca
- Class: Gastropoda
- Subclass: Caenogastropoda
- Order: Littorinimorpha
- Family: Eulimidae
- Genus: Parastilbe; Cossmann, 1900

Type species
- Stilbe acuta Jeffreys, 1884

Synonyms
- Stilbe Jeffreys, 1884 (preoccupied by Stilbe de Kay, 1842 (Pisces); Parastilbe is a replacement name)

Genus of gastropods

Parastilbe is a genus of parasitic sea snails, marine gastropod mollusks in the family Eulimidae.

== Species ==
- Parastilbe acuta (Jeffreys, 1884)
