= Goubinia =

Scientific classification
- Kingdom: Animalia
- Phylum: Mollusca
- Class: Gastropoda
- Subclass: Caenogastropoda
- Order: Littorinimorpha
- Family: Eulimidae
- Genus: Goubinia; Dautzenberg, 1923

Type species
- Eulima insueta Dautzenberg, 1923

Synonyms
- Eulima (Goubinia) Dautzenberg, 1923

Genus of gastropods

Goubinia is a very small genus of sea snails, marine gastropod mollusks in the family Eulimidae.

== Species ==
Goubinia insueta (Dautzenberg, 1923) is the only species known to exist within this genus of gastropods.
