= Asterolamia =

Scientific classification
- Kingdom: Animalia
- Phylum: Mollusca
- Class: Gastropoda
- Subclass: Caenogastropoda
- Order: Littorinimorpha
- Family: Eulimidae
- Genus: Asterolamia; Warén, 1980

Type species
- Asterolamia hians Warén, 1980

Genus of gastropods

Asterolamia is a genus of medium-sized sea snails, marine gastropod mollusks in the family Eulimidae.

== Species ==
There are only two known species within this genus of gastropods:

- Asterolamia cingulata (Warén, 1980)
- Asterolamia hians Warén, 1980
