= Acrochalix =

Scientific classification
- Kingdom: Animalia
- Phylum: Mollusca
- Class: Gastropoda
- Subclass: Caenogastropoda
- Order: Littorinimorpha
- Family: Eulimidae
- Genus: Acrochalix; Bouchet & Warén, 1986

Genus of gastropods

Acrochalix is a genus of medium-sized sea snails, marine gastropod mollusks in the family Eulimidae.

== Distribution ==
This species is mainly distributed within the north Atlantic Ocean.

== Species ==
There is only one known species within this genus:

- Acrochalix callosa Bouchet & Warén, 1986
