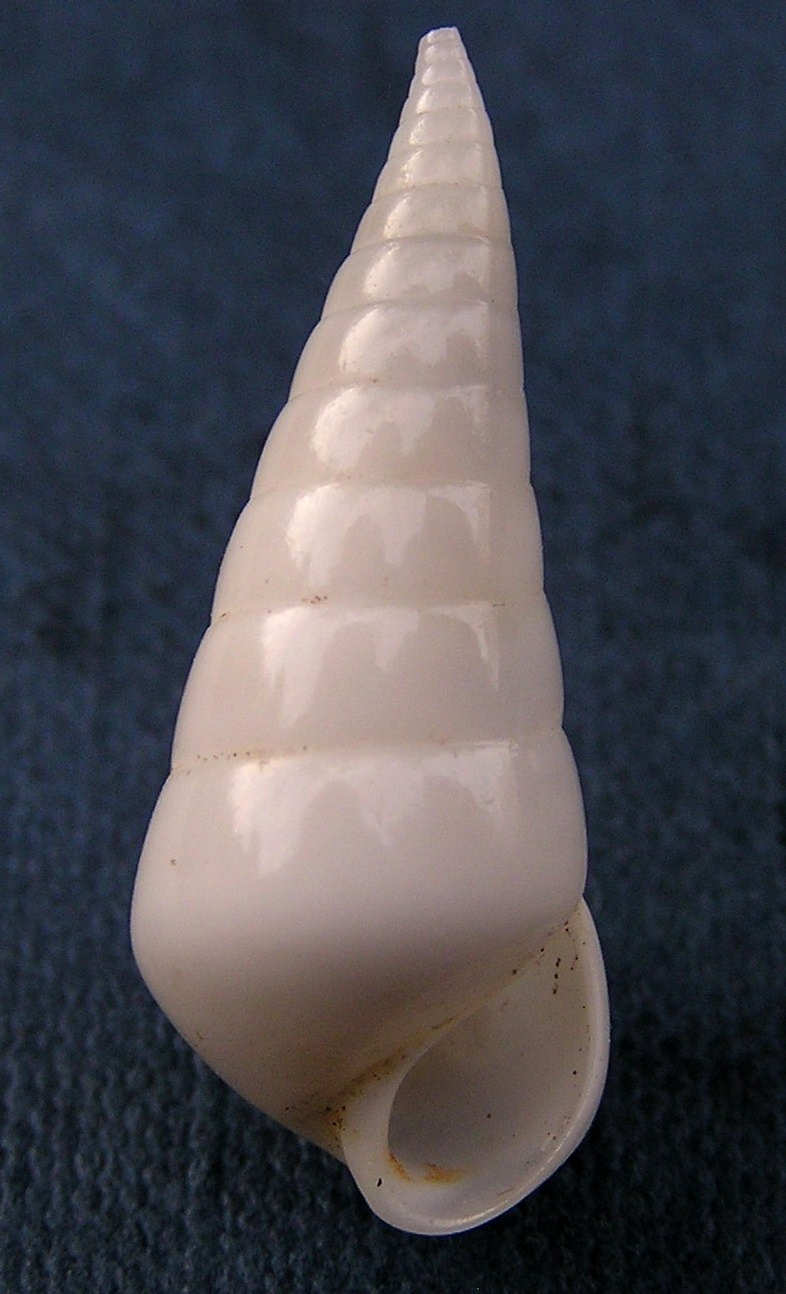
- Apertural view of the shell of Melanella martinii

Scientific classification
- Kingdom: Animalia
- Phylum: Mollusca
- Class: Gastropoda
- Subclass: Caenogastropoda
- Order: Littorinimorpha
- Family: Eulimidae
- Genus: Melanella
- Species: M. martinii

Binomial name
- Melanella martinii A. Adams 1854

Synonyms
- Eulima martinii A. Adams, 1854

= Melanella martinii =

Species of gastropod

Melanella martinii, common name the white parasitic snail, is a species of sea snail, a marine gastropod mollusk in the family Eulimidae.

== Description ==
The size of the shell varies between 20 mm and 50 mm.

(Original description in Latin) The shell is solid, polished, and milky white, rising into a slender, needle-like pyramidal shape that tapers to a softly undulating apex. Along its spire, numerous flattened whorls are joined by a continuous chain of deeply impressed varices that trace a distinct ridge along the right side, running uninterrupted all the way to the tip. Near the base, the body whorl forms a subtle, muted angle around an oval aperture, where the front margin of the outer lip turns outward, thickened and neatly reflected.

== Distribution ==
This marine species occurs in the Indo-west Pacific; also in the Red Sea; off the Philippines, Vietnam, Taiwan and Australia (Queensland, Western Australia).
