= Paedophoropus =

Scientific classification
- Kingdom: Animalia
- Phylum: Mollusca
- Class: Gastropoda
- Subclass: Caenogastropoda
- Order: Littorinimorpha
- Family: Eulimidae
- Genus: Paedophoropus; Ivanov, 1933

Type species
- Paedophoropus dicoelobicus Ivanov, 1933

Genus of gastropods

Paedophoropus is a genus of parasitic sea snails, marine gastropod mollusks in the family Eulimidae.

== Species ==
- Paedophoropus dicoelobicus Ivanov, 1933
