= Tropiometricola =

Scientific classification
- Kingdom: Animalia
- Phylum: Mollusca
- Class: Gastropoda
- Subclass: Caenogastropoda
- Order: Littorinimorpha
- Family: Eulimidae
- Genus: Tropiometricola; Warén, 1981

Type species
- Stilifer sphaeroconcha Habe, 1974

Genus of gastropods

Tropiometricola is a genus of very small ectoparasitic sea snails, marine gastropod mollusks or micromollusks in the Eulimidae family.

== Species ==
Species within the genus Tropiometricolainclude :

- Tropiometricola sphaeroconcha (Habe, 1974)
