= Peasistilifer =

Scientific classification
- Kingdom: Animalia
- Phylum: Mollusca
- Class: Gastropoda
- Subclass: Caenogastropoda
- Order: Littorinimorpha
- Family: Eulimidae
- Genus: Peasistilifer; Warén, 1980

Type species
- Mucronalia nitidula Pease, 1860

Genus of gastropods

Peasistilifer is a genus of parasitic sea snails, marine gastropod mollusks in the family Eulimidae.

== Species ==
- Peasistilifer edulis Hoskin & Warén, 1983
- Peasistilifer gracilis (Pease, 1867)
- Peasistilifer koyamai (Habe, 1976)
- Peasistilifer nitidula (Pease, 1860)
- Peasistilifer obesula (A. Adams, 1854)
- Peasistilifer solitaria (Laseron, 1955)
