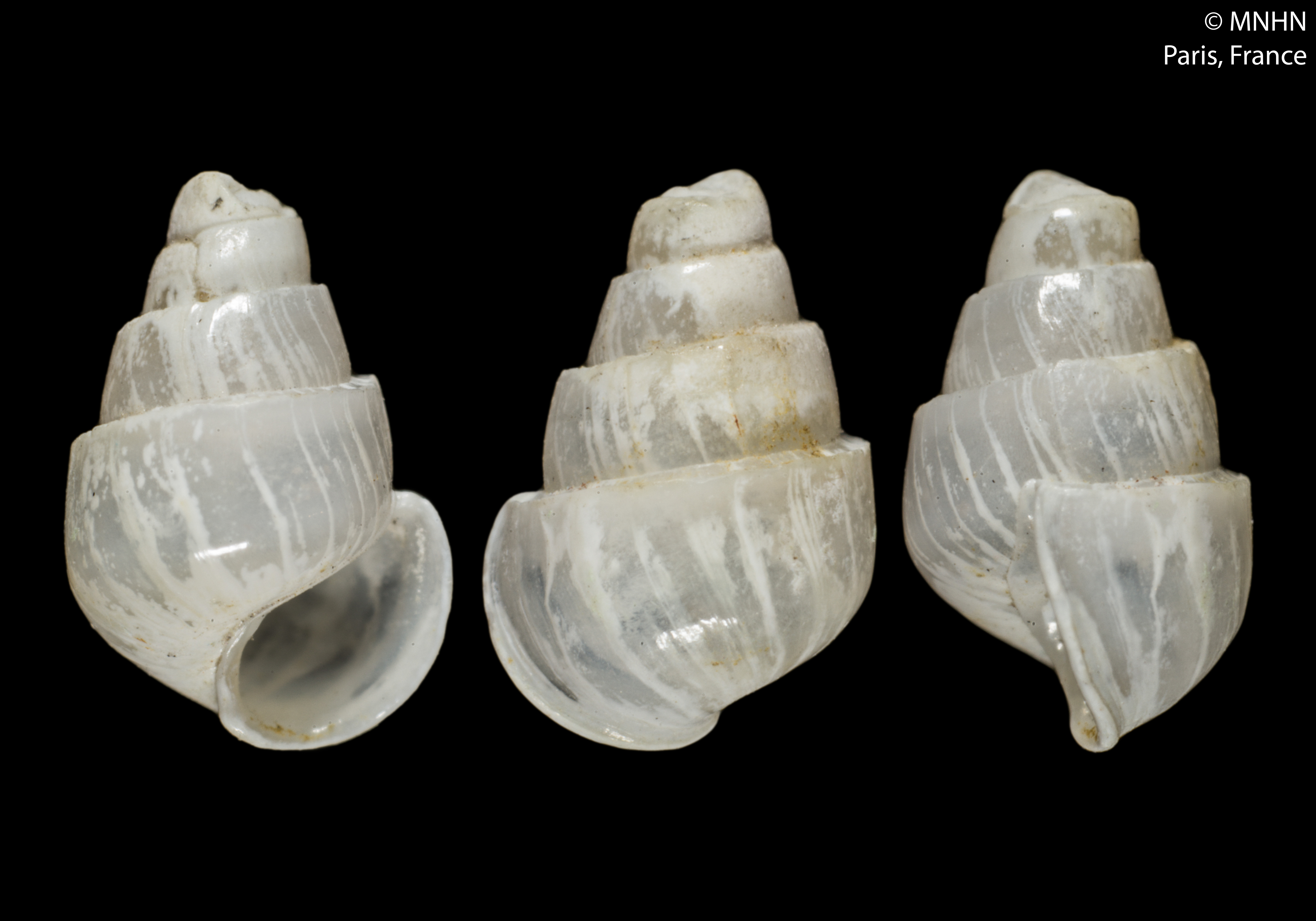
- Scalaribalcis angulata

Scientific classification
- Kingdom: Animalia
- Phylum: Mollusca
- Class: Gastropoda
- Subclass: Caenogastropoda
- Order: Littorinimorpha
- Superfamily: Vanikoroidea
- Family: Eulimidae
- Genus: Scalaribalcis; Gofas, 1990

Type species
- Mucronalia angulata Mandahl-Barth, 1949

Synonyms
- Mucronalia angulata Mandahl-Barth, 1949

= Scalaribalcis =

Genus of gastropods

Scalaribalcis is a monotypic genus of very small ectoparasitic sea snails, marine gastropod mollusks or micromollusks in the Eulimidae family. .

== Species ==
Species within the genera Scalaribalcis include:

- Scalaribalcis angulata (Mandahl-Barth, 1949) (length: 4.5 mm; distribution: Easter Island)
