= Trochostilifer =

Scientific classification
- Kingdom: Animalia
- Phylum: Mollusca
- Class: Gastropoda
- Subclass: Caenogastropoda
- Order: Littorinimorpha
- Family: Eulimidae
- Genus: Trochostilifer; Warén, 1980

Type species
- Trochostilifer domus Warén, 1980

Genus of gastropods

Trochostilifer is a genus of very small ectoparasitic sea snails, marine gastropod mollusks or micromollusks in the Eulimidae family.

== Species ==
Species within the genera Trochostilifer include:

- Trochostilifer domus Warén, 1980
- Trochostilifer entospinea Warén, B. L. Burch & T. A. Burch, 1984
- Trochostilifer eucidaricola Warén & Moolenbeek, 1989
- Trochostilifer hawaiiensis Warén, B. L. Burch & T. A. Burch, 1984
- Trochostilifer mortenseni Warén, 1980
- Trochostilifer phyllacanthicola Habe, 1989
- Trochostilifer striatus (Hedley, 1905)
