= Auriculigerina =

Scientific classification
- Kingdom: Animalia
- Phylum: Mollusca
- Class: Gastropoda
- Subclass: Caenogastropoda
- Order: Littorinimorpha
- Family: Eulimidae
- Genus: Auriculigerina; Dautzenberg, 1925

Genus of gastropods

Auriculigerina is a genus of medium-sized sea snails, marine gastropod mollusks in the family Eulimidae.

== Species ==
There is currently only one known species within this genus:

- Auriculigerina miranda Dautzenberg, 1925
