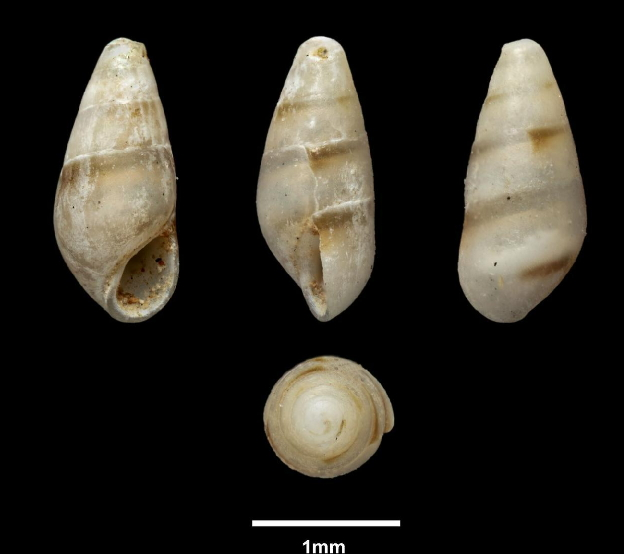
- Shell of Microeulima terebralis (specimen at the Natural History Museum, London)

Scientific classification
- Kingdom: Animalia
- Phylum: Mollusca
- Class: Gastropoda
- Subclass: Caenogastropoda
- Order: Littorinimorpha
- Family: Eulimidae
- Genus: Microeulima; Warén, 1992

= Microeulima =

Genus of gastropods

Microeulima is a genus of small sea snails, marine gastropod mollusks in the family Eulimidae.

== Species ==
- Microeulima bartschi (Strong & Hertlein, 1937)
- Microeulima hemphillii (Dall, 1884)
- Microeulima terebralis (Carpenter, 1857)

Species brought into synonymy

- Microeulima proca (de Folin, 1867): synonym of Microeulima terebralis (Carpenter, 1857)
- Microeulima violacea (Carpenter, 1857): synonym of Microeulima terebralis (Carpenter, 1857)
