= Menon (gastropod) =

Scientific classification
- Kingdom: Animalia
- Phylum: Mollusca
- Class: Gastropoda
- Subclass: Caenogastropoda
- Order: Littorinimorpha
- Family: Eulimidae
- Genus: Menon; Hedley, 1900

Genus of gastropods

Menon is a genus of medium-sized sea snails, marine gastropod mollusks in the family Eulimidae.

== Species ==
There is only one known species within this genus:

- Menon anceps Hedley, 1900
