= Hebeulima =

Scientific classification
- Kingdom: Animalia
- Phylum: Mollusca
- Class: Gastropoda
- Subclass: Caenogastropoda
- Order: Littorinimorpha
- Family: Eulimidae
- Genus: Hebeulima; Laseron, 1955

Type species
- Leiostraca inusta Hedley, 1906

Genus of gastropods

Hebeulima is a genus of sea snails, marine gastropod mollusks in the family Eulimidae.

== Species ==
There are two known species within this genus of gastropods, these include the following:

- Hebeulima columnaria (May, 1915)
- Hebeulima crassiceps (Laseron, 1955)
- Hebeulima insignis (Turton, 1932)
- Hebeulima inusta (Hedley, 1906)

Species brought into synonymy

- Hebeulima tumerae (Laseron, 1955): synonym of Oceanida tumerae (Laseron, 1955)
