= Gasterosiphon =

Scientific classification
- Kingdom: Animalia
- Phylum: Mollusca
- Class: Gastropoda
- Subclass: Caenogastropoda
- Order: Littorinimorpha
- Family: Eulimidae
- Genus: Gasterosiphon; Koehler & Vaney, 1905

Type species
- Entosiphon deimatis Koehler & Vaney, 1903

Synonyms
- Entosiphon Koehler & Vaney, 1903 (Invalid: junior homonym of Entosiphon Stein, 1878; Gasterosiphon is a replacement name)

Genus of gastropods

Gasterosiphon is a very small genus of sea snails, marine gastropod mollusks in the family Eulimidae.

== Species ==
- Gasterosiphon deimatis (Koehler & Vaney, 1903) is the only species known to exist within this genus of gastropods.
