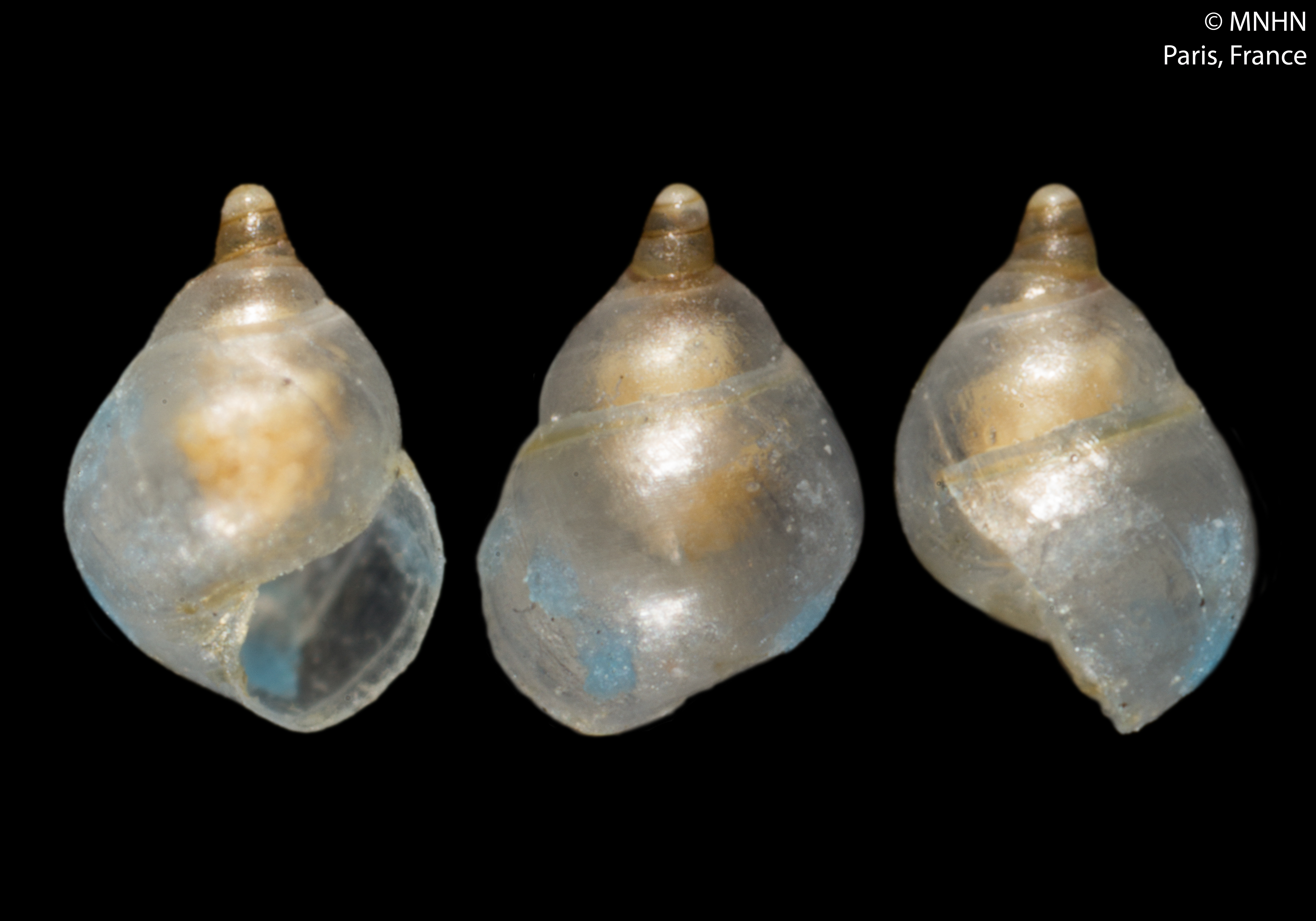
- Shell of Pelseneeria striata (holotype at MNHN, Paris)

Scientific classification
- Kingdom: Animalia
- Phylum: Mollusca
- Class: Gastropoda
- Subclass: Caenogastropoda
- Order: Littorinimorpha
- Superfamily: Vanikoroidea
- Family: Eulimidae
- Genus: Pelseneeria; Koehler & Vaney, 1908

Type species
- Pelseneeria profunda Koehler & Vaney, 1908

Synonyms
- Parastilifer A. V. Ivanov, 1952; Rosenia Nierstrasz, 1913 (non Waagen & Wentzel, 1886); Stylina Fleming, 1828 (non Lamarck, 1816); Turtonia Rosén, 1910 (non Alder, 1848); Venustilifer Powell, 1939

= Pelseneeria =

Genus of gastropods

Pelseneeria is a genus of very small ectoparasitic sea snails, marine gastropod mollusks or micromollusks in the family Eulimidae. This genus was first described by R. Koehler and C. Vaney in 1908.

== Species ==
Species within the genera Pelseneeria include:

- Pelseneeria bountyensis Powell, 1933
- Pelseneeria brunnea Tate, 1887
- Pelseneeria castanea Dall, 1925
- Pelseneeria hawaiiensis Warén, B. L. Burch & T. A. Burch, 1984
- Pelseneeria media Koehler & Vaney, 1908
- Pelseneeria minor Koehler & Vaney, 1908
- Pelseneeria minuta Dall, 1927
- Pelseneeria perdepressa Dall, 1925
- Pelseneeria profunda Koehler & Vaney, 1908 (Type taxon)
- Pelseneeria secunda Powell, 1940
- † Pelseneeria senuti Lozouet, 1999
- Pelseneeria sibogae Schepman & Nierstrasz, 1909
- Pelseneeria stimpsonii A. E. Verrill, 1872
- Pelseneeria striata Bouchet & Warén, 1986
- Pelseneeria stylifera Turton, 1825
- Pelseneeria sudamericana Pastorino & Zelaya, 2001
- Pelseneeria thurstoni Winckworth, 1936
- Pelseneeria yamamotoi Habe, 1952

Species brought into synonymy

- Pelseneeria globosus (Johnston, 1841): synonym of Pelseneeria stylifera (Turton, 1825)
- Pelseneeria secundus [sic]: synonym of Pelseneeria secunda (Powell, 1940)
- Pelseneeria turtoni (Broderip, 1832): synonym of Pelseneeria stylifera (Turton, 1825)
- Pelseneeria verrilli (Dall, 1927): synonym of Pelseneeria stimpsonii (A. E. Verrill, 1872)
