= Goriella =

Scientific classification
- Kingdom: Animalia
- Phylum: Mollusca
- Class: Gastropoda
- Subclass: Caenogastropoda
- Order: Littorinimorpha
- Family: Eulimidae
- Genus: Goriella; Moolenbeek, 2008

Genus of gastropods

Goriella is a very small genus of sea snails, marine gastropod mollusks in the family Eulimidae.

== Species ==
Goriella sandroi Moolenbeek, 2008 is the only species known to exist within this genus of gastropods.
