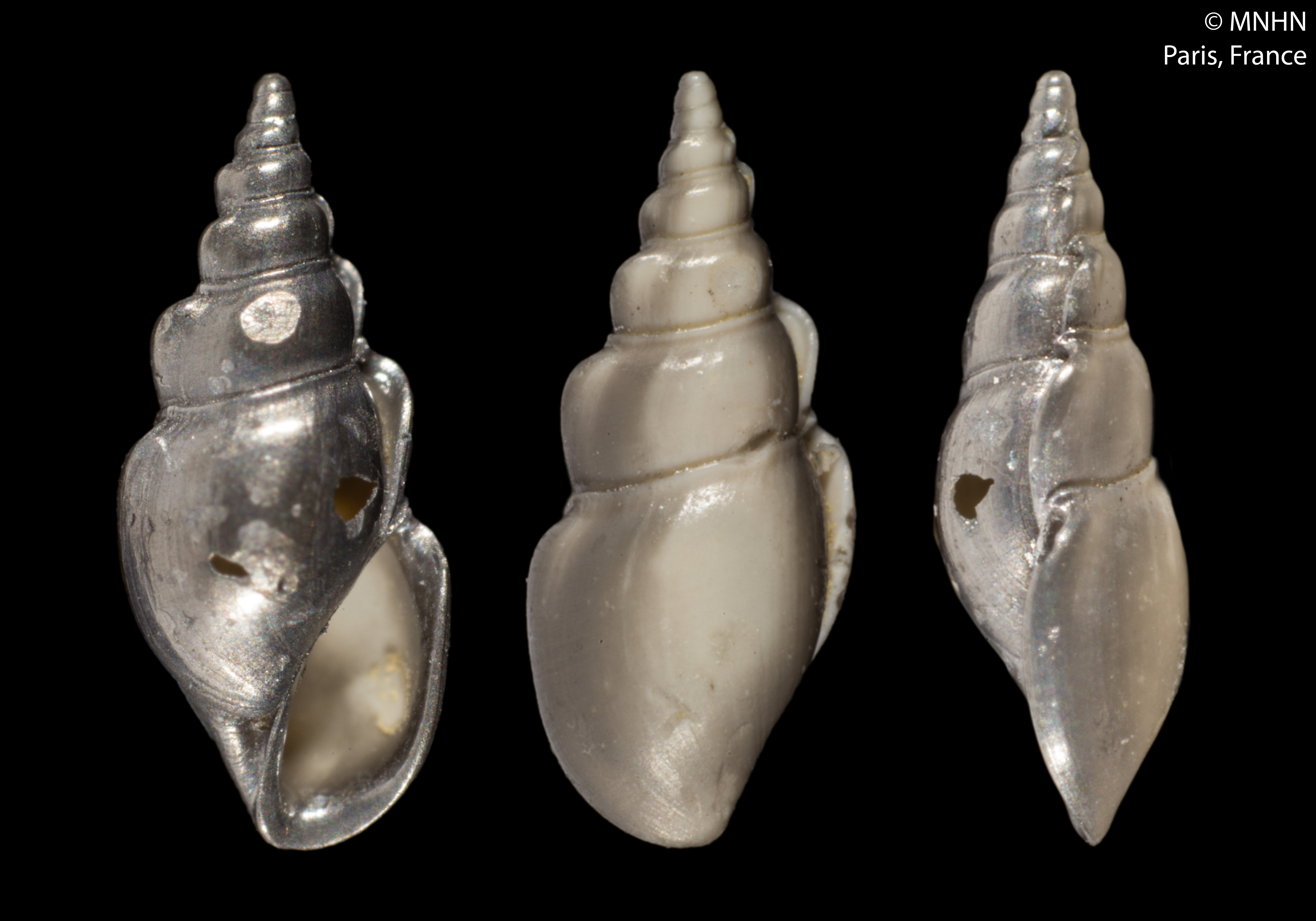
- Shell of † Chileutomia paulensis (holotype at MNHN, Paris)

Scientific classification
- Kingdom: Animalia
- Phylum: Mollusca
- Class: Gastropoda
- Subclass: Caenogastropoda
- Order: Littorinimorpha
- Family: Eulimidae
- Genus: Chileutomia [Tate & Cossman, 1898

Type species
- † Chileutomia subvaricosa Tate & Cossmann, 1898

= Chileutomia =

Genus of gastropods

Chileutomia is a genus of medium-sized sea snails, marine gastropod mollusks in the family Eulimidae.

== Species ==
The species within this genus include the following:

- Chileutomia neozelanica (Powell, 1940)
- † Chileutomia paulensis Lozouet, 1999
- † Chileutomia subvaricosa (Tate & Cossman, 1898)

Species brought into synonymy

- Chileutomia corallina (Hedley, 1912): synonym of Oceanida corallina (Hedley, 1912).
