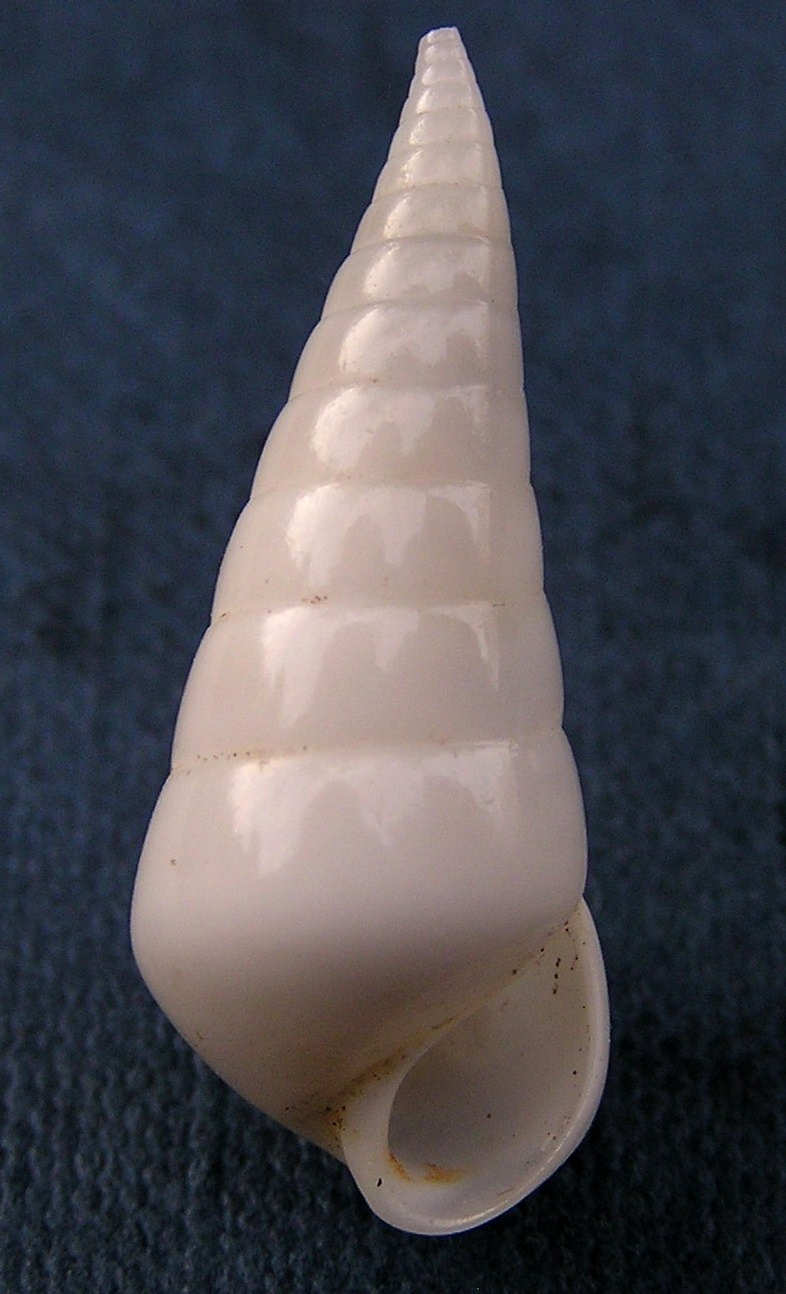
- Apertural view of the shell of Melanella candida

Scientific classification
- Kingdom: Animalia
- Phylum: Mollusca
- Class: Gastropoda
- Subclass: Caenogastropoda
- Order: Littorinimorpha
- Superfamily: Vanikoroidea
- Family: Eulimidae; Philippi, 1853

Synonyms
- Aclididae G.O. Sars, 1878; Asterophilidae Thiele, 1925; Enteroxenidae Schwanwitsch, 1917; Enteroxeninae Schwanwitsch, 1917 (a junior synonym); Entocolacidae Voigt, 1888; Entoconchidae Keferstein, 1864; Melanellidae Iredale, 1915; Paedophoropodidae A. V. Ivanov, 1933; Pelseneeriidae Schwanwitsch, 1917; Pherusidae Locard, 1886 (type genus a junior homonym of Pherusa Oken, 1807, and several others); Roseniidae Nierstrasz, 1913; Stiliferidae H. Adams & A. Adams, 1853; Strombiformidae Iredale, 1915; Stylinidae Philippi, 1853 (Invalid: type genus [Stylina Fleming, 1828] a junior homonym); Thycidae Thiele, 1929; Thycinae Thiele, 1929; Turtoniidae Rosén, 1910 (Invalid: type genus [Turtonia Rosén, 1910] a junior homonym)

= Eulimidae =

Family of gastropods

Eulimidae is a family of very small parasitic sea snails, marine gastropod mollusks in the superfamily Vanikoroidea.

== Description ==
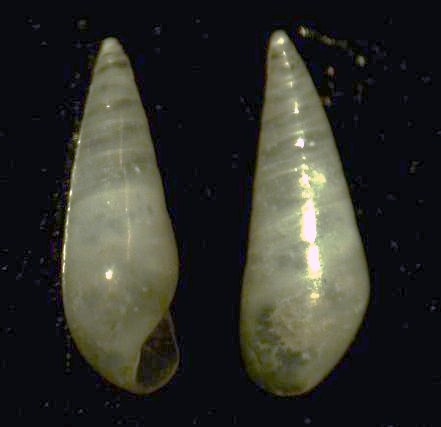
Eulima algoensis

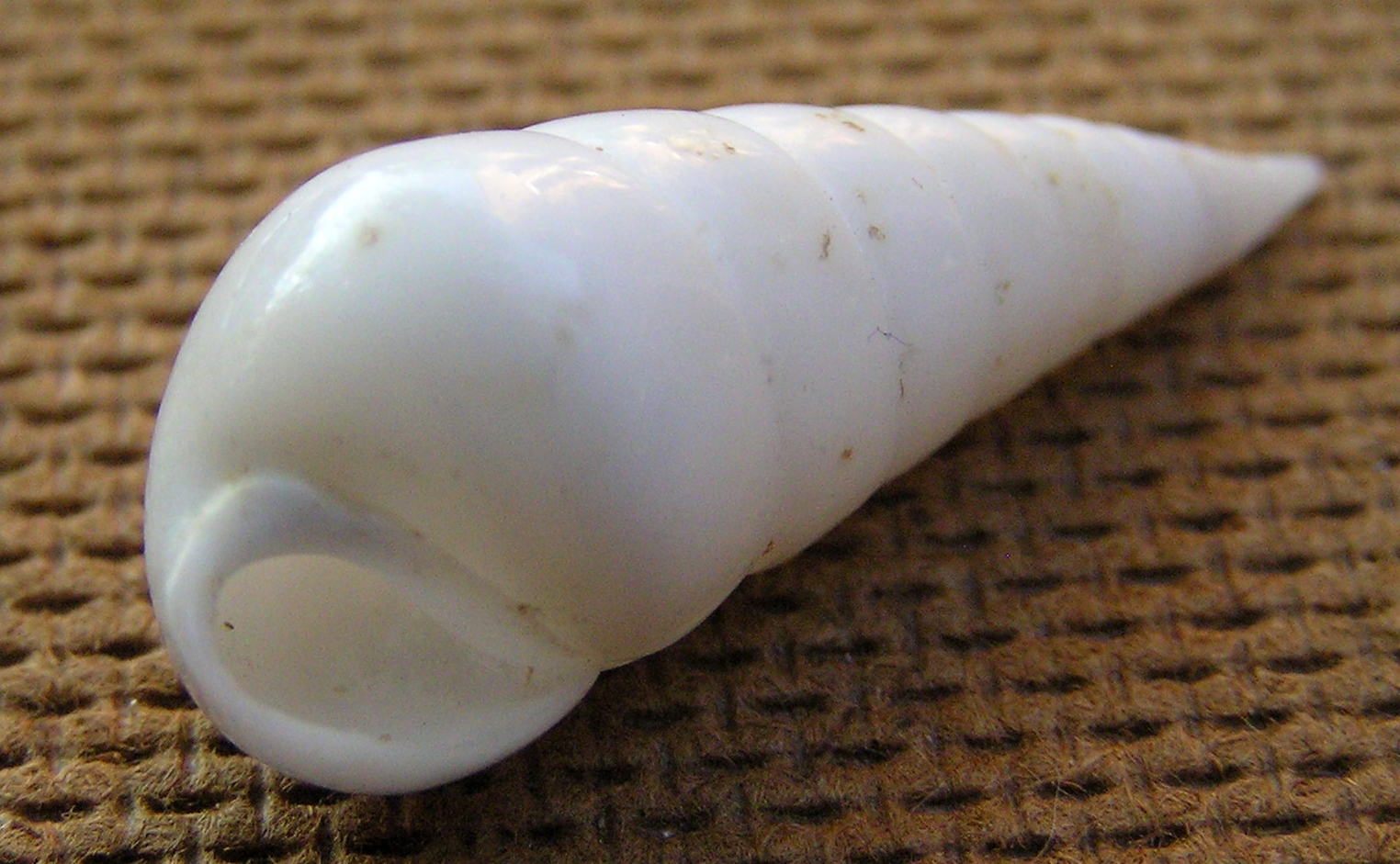
Melanella martinii

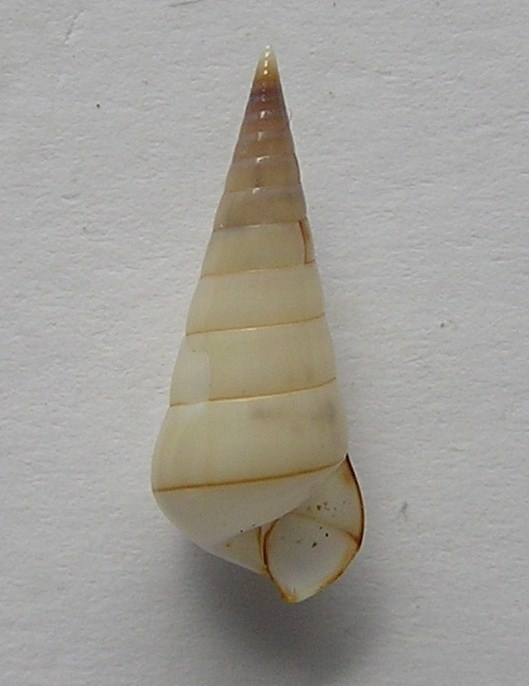
Niso hizenensis

This is a species-rich family, encompassing more than 960 species according to WoRMS. Nevertheless, Warén & Gittenberger (1993) offered a broad estimate suggesting that Eulimidae may encompass more than 4,000 species. Even this may be unerestimated. A huge sampling effort in New Caledonia area estimated that 80% of the eulimids collected may represent undescribed species.

These small parasitic snails live on (or in some cases in) the bodies of echinoderms such as sea cucumbers, sea urchins, sea stars, etc. All species lack a radula, in most cases possessing a proboscis which they extend into their host's body cavity in order to feed.

== Genera ==
Genera within the family Eulimidae include:

- Abyssoaclis Barros et al., 2003
- Aclis S.L. Lovén, 1846
- Acrochalix Bouchet & Warén, 1986
- Amamibalcis Kuroda & Habe, 1950
- Annulobalcis Habe, 1965
- Apicalia A. Adams, 1862
- Arcuella G. Nevill & H. Nevill, 1874
- Asterolamia Warén, 1980
- Asterophila Randall & Heath, 1912
- Auriculigerina Dautzenberg, 1925
- Austrorissopsis Grant-Mackie & Chapman-Smith, 1971
- Awanuia Powell, 1927
- Bacula H. Adams & A. Adams, 1863
- Batheulima F. Nordsieck, 1968
- Bathycrinicola Bouchet & Warén, 1986
- Bulimeulima Bouchet & Warén, 1986
- Campylorhaphion Bouchet & Warén, 1986
- Chileutomia Tate & Cossman, 1898
- Clypeastericola Warén, 1994
- Concavibalcis Warén, 1980
- Costaclis Bartsch, 1947
- Crinolamia Bouchet & Warén, 1979
- Crinophtheiros Bouchet & Warén, 1986
- Curveulima Laseron, 1955
- Cyclonidea C. F. Laseron, 1956
- Diacolax Mandahl-Barth, 1946
- Discaclis Moolenbeek & Warén, 1987
- Echineulima Lützen & Nielsen, 1975
- Echiuroidicola Warén, 1980
- Enteroxenos Bonnevie, 1902
- Entocolax Voigt, 1888
- Entoconcha J. Muller, 1852
- Ersilia Monterosato, 1872
- Eulima Risso, 1826
- Eulimacrostoma Leonardo Santos de Souza, Alexandre Dias Pimenta, 2019
- Eulimetta Warén, 1992
- Eulimostraca Bartsch, 1917
- Eulitoma Laseron, 1955
- Fuscapex Warén, 1981
- Fusceulima Laseron, 1955
- Gasterosiphon Koehler & Vaney, 1905
- Goodingia Lützen, 1972
- Goriella Moolenbeek, 2008
- Goubinia Dautzenberg, 1923
- Haliella Monterosato, 1878
- Halielloides Bouchet & Warén, 1986
- Hebeulima Laseron, 1955
- Hemiaclis G. O. Sars, 1878
- Hemiliostraca Pilsbry, 1917
- Hoenselaaria Moolenbeek, 2009
- Hoplopteron P. Fischer, 1876
- Hypermastus Pilsbry, 1899
- Larochella A.W.B. Powell, 1927
- Margineulima Cossmann, 1888
- Megadenus Rosén, 1910
- Melanella Bowdich, 1822
- Menon Hedley, 1900
- Microeulima Waren, 1992
- Molpadicola Grusov, 1957
- Monogamus Lützen, 1976
- Mucronalia A. Adams, 1860
- Nanobalcis Waren & Mifsud, 1990
- Niso Risso, 1826
- Oceanida de Folin, 1870
- Ophieulima Warén & Sibuet, 1981
- Ophioarachnicola Warén, 1980
- Ophiolamia Warén & Carney, 1981
- Paedophoropus Ivanov, 1933
- Palisadia Laseron, 1956
- Paramegadenus Humphreys & Lützen, 1972
- Parastilbe Cossman, 1900
- Parvioris Warén, 1981
- Peasistilifer Warén, 1980
- Pelseneeria Koehler & Vaney, 1908
- Pictobalcis Laseron, 1955
- Pisolamia Bouchet & Lützen, 1976
- Polygireulima Sacco, 1892
- Prostilifer Warén, 1980
- Pseudosabinella McLean, 1995
- Pulicicochlea Ponder & Gooding, 1978
- Punctifera Warén, 1981
- Pyramidelloides Nevill 1884
- Rectilabrum Bouchet & Warén, 1986
- Robillardia E.A. Smith, 1889
- † Rostreulima Cossmann, 1913
- Ruapukea R.K. Dell, 1952
- Sabinella Monterosato, 1890
- Sanciaella Moolenbeek & Hoenselaar, 2010
- Scalaribalcis Warén, 1980
- Scalaronoba A.W.B. Powell, 1927
- Scalenostoma Deshayes, 1863
- Selma A. Adams, 1863
- † Semistylifer Cossmann, 1921
- Severnsia Geiger, 2016
- Sticteulima Laseron, 1955
- Stilapex Iredale, 1925
- Stilifer Broderip [in Broderip & Sowerby], 1832
- Subniso McLean, 2000
- Teretianax Iredale, 1918
- Thaleia Waren, 1979
- Thyca H. Adams & A. Adams, 1854
- Thyonicola Mandahl-Barth, 1941
- Trochostilifer Warén, 1980
- Tropiometricola Warén, 1981
- Turveria Berry, 1956
- Umbilibalcis Bouchet & Waren, 1986
- Vitreobalcis Warén, 1980
- Vitreolina Monterosato, 1884

Genera brought into synonymy

- Acicularia Monterosato, 1884: synonym of Polygireulima Sacco, 1892
- Athleenia Bartsch, 1946: synonym of Oceanida de Folin, 1870
- Balcis Leach, 1847: synonym of Melanella Bowdich, 1822
- Bessomia Berry, 1959: synonym of Thyca H. Adams & A. Adams, 1854
- Bonellia Deshayes, 1838: synonym of Niso Risso, 1826
- Chryseulima Laseron, 1955: synonym of Apicalia A. Adams, 1862
- Comenteroxenos Tikasingh, 1961: synonym of Enteroxenos Bonnevie, 1902
- Cuspeulima Laseron, 1955: synonym of Eulima Risso, 1826
- Entosiphon Koehler & Vaney, 1903: synonym of Gasterosiphon Koehler & Vaney, 1905
- Eulimaustra Laseron, 1955: synonym of Melanella Bowdich, 1822
- Eulimitra Laseron, 1955: synonym of Hemiliostraca Pilsbry, 1917
- Eulimoda Laseron, 1955: synonym of Sabinella Monterosato, 1890
- Granulithyca Habe, 1976: synonym of Thyca H. Adams & A. Adams, 1854
- Halliella Monterosato, 1878: synonym of Haliella Monterosato, 1878
- Helicosyrinx Baur, 1864: synonym of Entoconcha J. Müller, 1852
- Hersilia Monterosato, 1884: synonym of Ersilia Monterosato, 1872
- Hoplopteropsis de Morgan, 1916: synonym of Oceanida de Folin, 1870
- Hyperlia Pilsbry, 1918: synonym of Scalenostoma Deshayes, 1863
- Kiramodulus Kuroda, 1949: synonym of Thyca H. Adams & A. Adams, 1854
- Lambertia Souverbie, 1869: synonym of Stilapex Iredale, 1925
- Leiostraca H. Adams & A. Adams, 1853: synonym of Eulima Risso, 1826
- Lentigobalcis Habe, 1961: synonym of Sticteulima Laseron, 1955
- Luetzenia Rehder, 1980: synonym of Robillardia E.A. Smith, 1889
- Luetzenia Warén, 1980: synonym of Echineulima Lützen & Nielsen, 1975
- Neovolusia Emerson, 1965: synonym of Niso Risso, 1826
- Paedophorus Ivanov, 1933: synonym of Paedophoropus Ivanov, 1933
- Parastilifer A.V. Ivanov, 1952: synonym of Pelseneeria Koehler & Vaney, 1908
- Parenteroxenos A.V. Ivanov, 1945: synonym of Thyonicola Mandahl-Barth, 1941
- Rosenia Nierstrasz, 1913: synonym of Pelseneeria Koehler & Vaney, 1908
- Spiroclimax Mörch, 1875: synonym of Oceanida de Folin, 1870
- Stilimella Laseron, 1955: synonym of Scalenostoma Deshayes, 1863
- Strombiformis Da Costa, 1778: synonym of Eulima Risso, 1826
- Stylapex: synonym of Stilapex Iredale, 1925
- Stylifer Cossmann, 1921: synonym of Stilifer Broderip [in Broderip & Sowerby I], 1832
- Stylina Fleming, 1828: synonym of Pelseneeria Koehler & Vaney, 1908
- Subeulima Souverbie, 1875: synonym of Bacula H. Adams & A. Adams, 1863
- Subularia Monterosato, 1884: synonym of Eulima Risso, 1826
- Teretianax Iredale, 1918: synonym of Pyramidelloides G. Nevill, 1885
- Subfamily Thycinae: synonym of Eulimidae
- Turtonia Rosén, 1910: synonym of Pelseneeria Koehler & Vaney, 1908
- Venustilifer Powell, 1939: synonym of Pelseneeria Koehler & Vaney, 1908
- Volusia A. Adams, 1851: synonym of Niso Risso, 1826
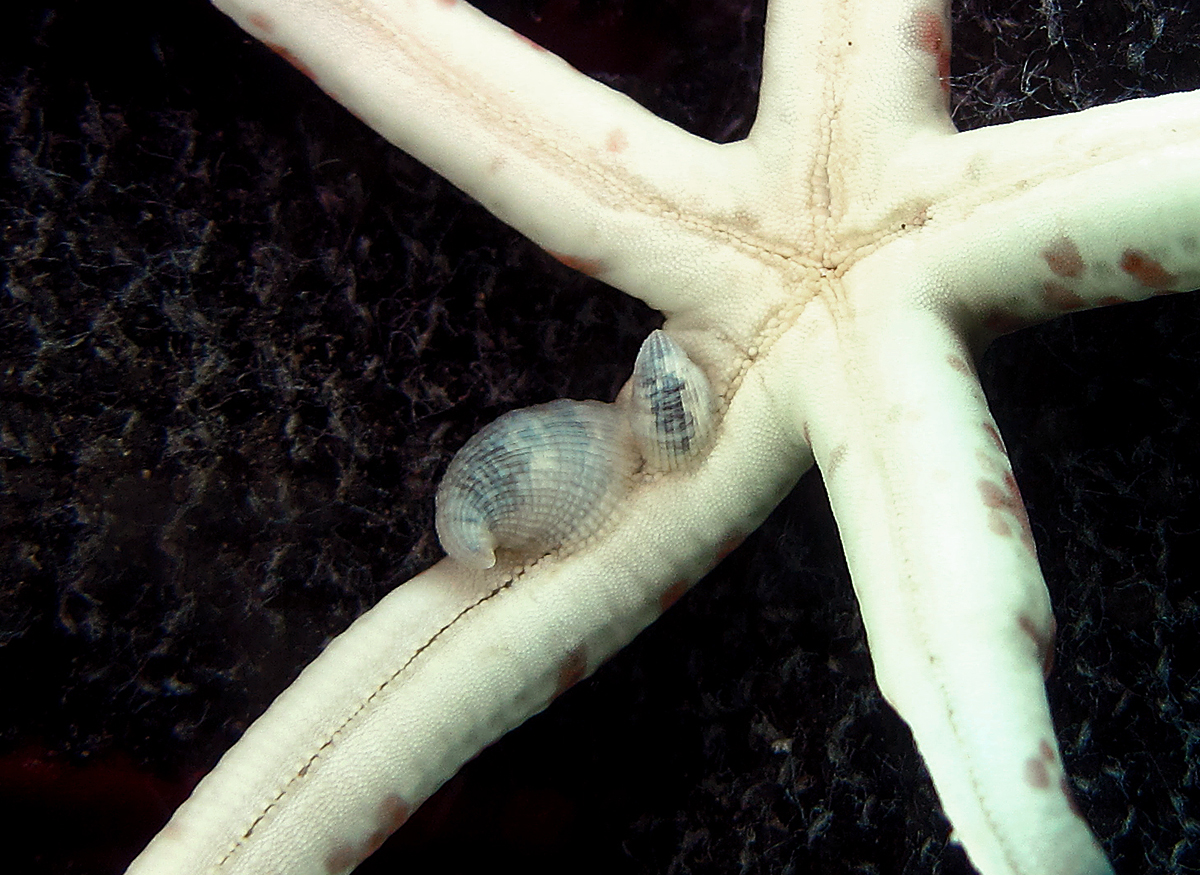
Thyca ectoconcha parasiting a sea star Linckia multifora.

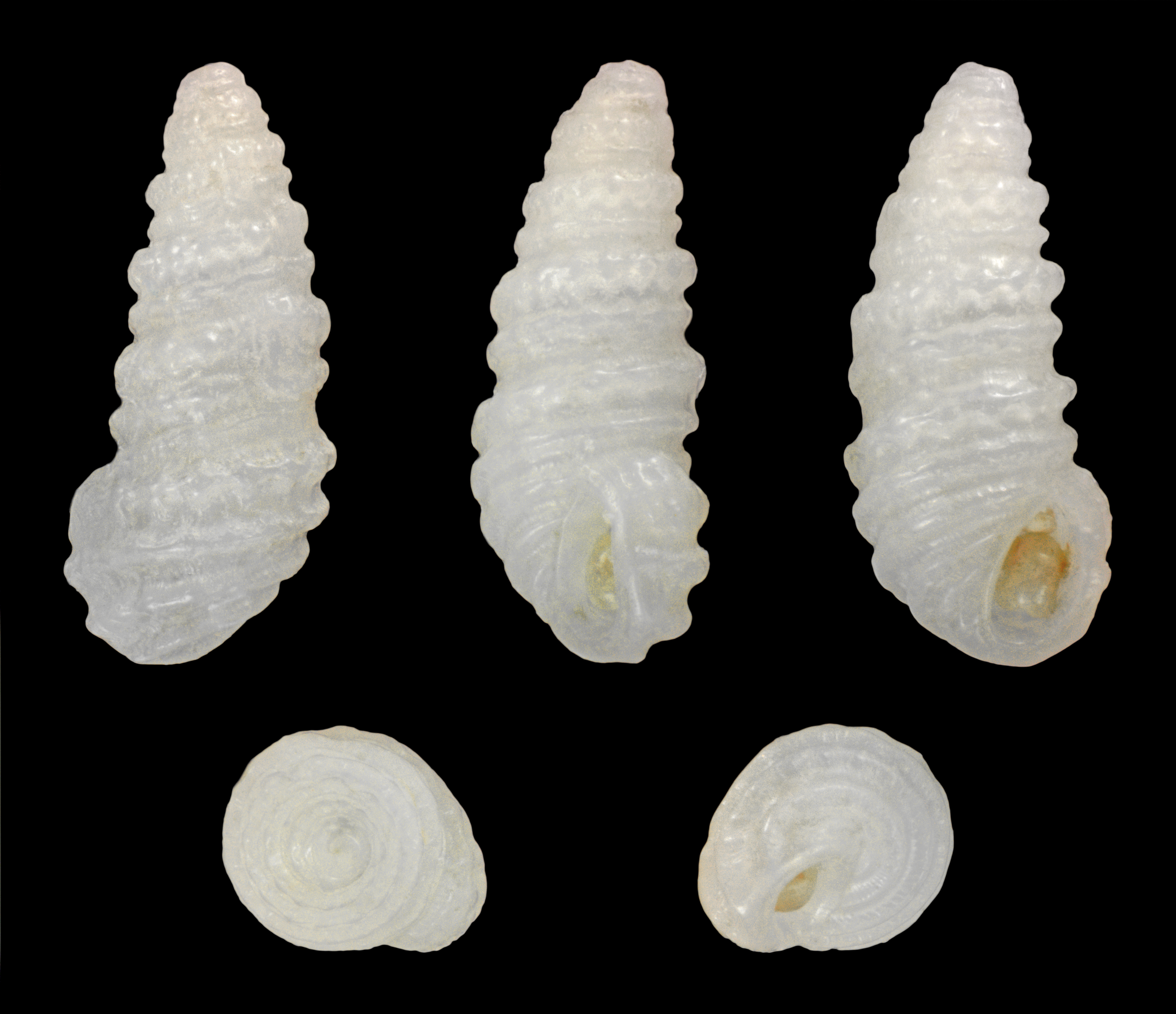
Pyramidelloides mirandus

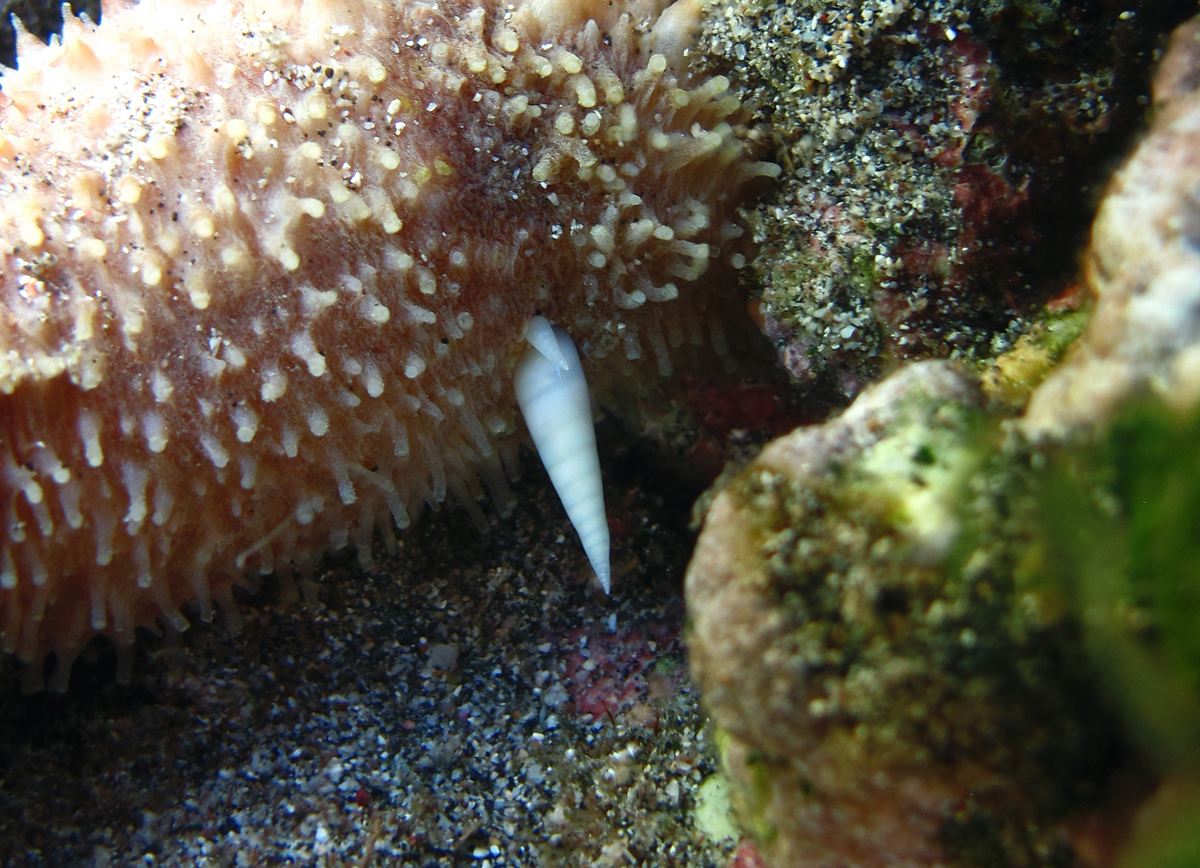
Eulimids on a juvenile sea cucumber Holothuria verrucosa.
