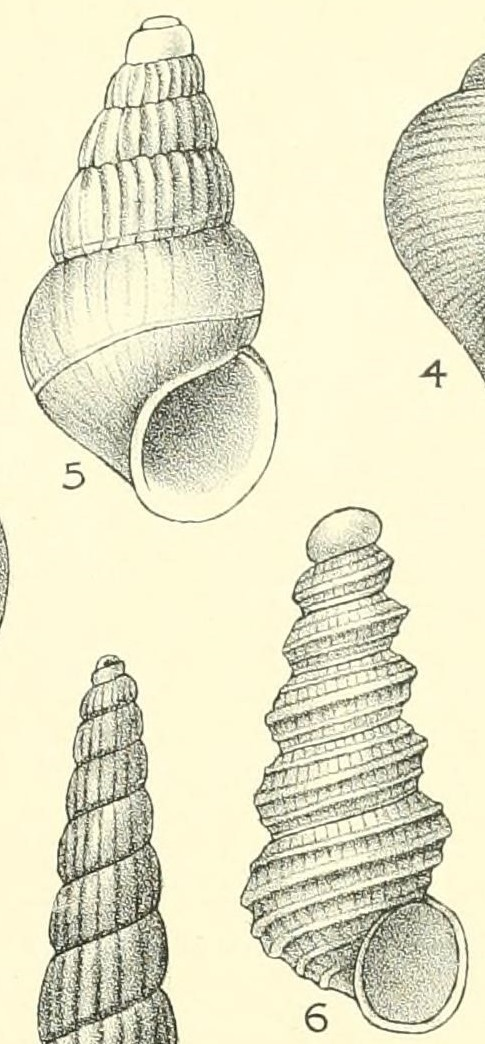
- Fig. 5. Aclis semireticulata. Fig. 6. Arlis succinta

Scientific classification
- Kingdom: Animalia
- Phylum: Mollusca
- Class: Gastropoda
- Subclass: Caenogastropoda
- Order: Littorinimorpha
- Superfamily: Vanikoroidea
- Family: Eulimidae
- Genus: Aclis; Lovén, 1846

Type species
- Alvania supranitida S. V. Wood, 1842

Synonyms
- Aclis (Aclis) Lovén, 1846; Eusetia Cotton, 1944; Marteliella Dautzenberg & Durouchoux, 1914; Menippe Jeffreys, 1867 (invalid: junior homonym of Menippe de Haan, 1833; Pherusa Jeffreys, 1869, is a replacement name); Pherusa Jeffreys, 1869 (invalid: junior homonym of Pherusa Oken, 1807, and Pherusa Leach, 1814; Pherusina and Marteliella are replacement names); Pherusina Norman, 1888; Schwengelia Bartsch, 1947

= Aclis =

Genus of gastropods

Aclis is a genus of small sea snails, marine gastropod mollusks in the family Eulimidae.

== Description ==
The shell is minute, elongate- turreted like Turritella. They are usually thin and translucent. The protoconch is slender and consists usually of two whorls. The remainder are convex and well-rounded. The suture is prominent and well-impressed. The shell is usually spirally striated. The apex is sinistral. The aperture is oval. The thin outer lip is prominent. The axis is slightly rimate. The base of the shell is rounded. The shell has an operculum.

The animal shows a long retractile proboscis. The slender tentacles are close together. They are inflated at the tips. The eyes are immersed at the bases of the tentacles. The operculum lobe is ample. The foot is truncated in front.

== Species ==
- † Aclis alta (Gabb, 1873)
- Aclis angulata E. A. Smith, 1890
- Aclis angulifera (Yokoyama, 1922)
- Aclis ascaris (Turton, 1819)
- Aclis attenuans Jeffreys, 1883
- † Aclis aurisparva Bertolaso & Garilli, 2009
- † Aclis bartolomeae Tabanelli, 1997
- † Aclis bicincta G. Seguenza, 1880
- Aclis bitaeniata G. B. Sowerby III, 1903
- † Aclis brugnoniana De Stefani & Pantanelli, 1879
- Aclis calotropis Melvill & Standen, 1901
- Aclis canaliculata (E. A. Smith, 1890)
- † Aclis cellinii Chirli, 2009
- Aclis conula Dall, 1927
- Aclis corniculata L. Souza, Araújo & Pimenta, 2024
- Aclis didyma E. A. Smith, 1890
- Aclis enilda Melvill & Standen, 1901
- Aclis eoa Melvill, 1896
- Aclis eolis Bartsch, 1947
- Aclis expansa (Powell, 1930)
- Aclis floridana Bartsch, 1911
- Aclis gittenbergeri (De Jong & Coomans, 1988)
- Aclis gulsonae (W. Clark, 1850)
- † Aclis guttula Rindone, 1990
- Aclis hendersoni Dall, 1927
- † Aclis insolita Lozouet, 2015
- Aclis kanela Absalão, 2009
- † Aclis latior G. Seguenza, 1876
- Aclis loveniana A. Adams, 1861
- Aclis macrostoma Barros, Lima & Francisco, 2007
- Aclis maestratii Poppe & Tagaro, 2016
- Aclis maoria Powell, 1937
- Aclis marguerita (Bartsch, 1947)
- Aclis minor (Brown, 1827)
- † Aclis penetrans Sosso, 1999
- † Aclis planostoma (F. W. Hutton, 1885)
- † Aclis proascaris Sacco, 1891
- Aclis protracta Thiele, 1925
- Aclis pseudopareora Powell, 1940
- Aclis pulchra L. Souza, Araújo & Pimenta, 2024
- Aclis pyramida Dall, 1927
- Aclis rushi Bartsch, 1911
- Aclis sansibarica Thiele, 1925
- Aclis sarissa Watson, 1881
- Aclis sarsi Dautzenberg & H. Fischer, 1912
- † Aclis scalaris G. Seguenza, 1876
- Aclis shepardiana Dall, 1919
- Aclis siberutensis Thiele, 1925
- Aclis stilifer Dall, 1927
- Aclis subcarinata (Murdoch & Suter, 1906)
- Aclis talaverai Brunetti & Cresti, 2018
- Aclis tenuis A. E. Verrill, 1882
- Aclis terebra (Powell, 1930)
- Aclis torta Thiele, 1925
- Aclis trilineata Watson, 1897
- Aclis tumens Carpenter, 1857
- † Aclis umbilicaris G. Seguenza, 1876
- Aclis verrilli Bartsch, 1911
- Aclis vitrea Watson, 1897
- Aclis walleri Jeffreys, 1867
- Aclis watsoni Barros, Lima & Francisco, 2007

taxon inquirendum

- Aclis angulata P. Fischer in de Folin & Périer, 1869
- Aclis beltista Melvill, 1904
- Aclis cingulata A. Adams, 1860
- † Aclis constantinensis de Boury, 1902
- Aclis crenulata de Folin, 1879
- Aclis crystallina A. Adams, 1851
- † Aclis dialytospira de Boury, 1902
- † Aclis dumasi de Boury, 1902
- Aclis exaereta Melvill, 1898
- Aclis fulgida A. Adams, 1861
- † Aclis gallica de Boury, 1912
- Aclis hypergonia Schwengel & T. L. McGinty
- Aclis lirata A. Adams, 1860
- † Aclis loveni M. Hörnes, 1856
- Aclis minutissima R. B. Watson, 1886
- Aclis polita Gabb, 1873 † d)
- Aclis sulcata A. Adams, 1860
- Aclis thesauraria Melvill, 1904
- Aclis unilineata G. B. Sowerby III, 1894

== Species brought into synonymy ==
- Aclis acuminata H. Adams & A. Adams: synonym of Amaea acuminata (Sowerby II, 1844)
- Aclis acuta (Jeffreys, 1884): synonym of Parastilbe acuta (Jeffreys, 1884)
- Aclis acutalis (Jeffreys, 1883): synonym of Aclis attenuans Jeffreys, 1883
- Aclis africana (Bartsch, 1915): synonym of Graphis africana Bartsch, 1915
- Aclis atemeles Melvill, 1896: synonym of Iravadia atemeles (Melvill, 1896)
- Aclis beddomei Dautzenberg, 1912: synonym of Acliceratia beddomei (Dautzenberg, 1912)
- Aclis bermudensis Dall & Bartsch, 1911: synonym of Murchisonella spectrum (Mörch, 1875)
- Aclis bilirata de Folin, 1873: synonym of Hamarilla amoebaea (R. B. Watson, 1886) (dubious synonym)
- Aclis californica Bartsch, 1927; synonym of Allopeas gracile (T. Hutton, 1834) (junior subjective synonym)
- Aclis carinata E. A. Smith, 1872: synonym of Acliceratia carinata (E. A. Smith, 1872)
- Aclis carolinensis Bartsch, 1911: synonym of Hemiaclis carolinensis (Bartsch, 1911)
- Aclis columnaria May 1911: synonym of Epigrus columnaria (May 1911) (original combination)
- † Aclis costellata F. W. Hutton, 1885: synonym of † Zeradina costellata (F. W. Hutton, 1885) (superseded combination)
- Aclis cubana Bartsch, 1911: synonym of Graphis cubana (Bartsch, 1911) (superseded combination)
- Aclis dalli Bartsch, 1911: synonym of Aclis sarissa Watson, 1881
- † Aclis discreta Fenaux, 1938: synonym of † Graphis discreta (Fenaux, 1938) (unaccepted > superseded combination)
- Aclis egregia Dall, 1889: synonym of Costaclis egregia (Dall, 1889)
- Aclis farolita Nordsieck, 1969: synonym of Graphis albida (Kanmacher, 1798)
- Aclis fernandinae Dall, 1927: synonym of Aclis tenuis A. E. Verrill, 1882
- Aclis fusiformis P. P. Carpenter, 1857: synonym of Onoba fusiformis (P. P. Carpenter, 1856) (superseded combination)
- Aclis georgiana Dall, 1927: synonym of Hemiaclis georgiana (Dall, 1927)
- Aclis hyalina (Watson, 1880): synonym of Costaclis hyalina (Watson, 1881)
- Aclis immaculata Dall, 1927: synonym of Fusceulima immaculata (Dall, 1927) (superseded combination)
- Aclis jeffreysii Tryon, 1887: synonym of Graphis striata (Jeffreys, 1884)
- Aclis kermadecensis Knudsen, 1964: synonym of Crinolamia kermadecensis (Knudsen, 1964)
- Aclis labiata A. Adams, 1860: synonym of Cyclonidea labiata (A. Adams, 1860)
- Aclis lata Dall, 1889: synonym of Umbilibalcis lata (Dall, 1889)
- Aclis limata Dall, 1927: synonym of Melanella limata (Dall, 1927)
- Aclis lineata Monterosato, 1869: synonym of Fusceulima lineata (Monterosato, 1869)
- Aclis micra Petterd, 1884: synonym of Koloonella micra (Petterd, 1884) (original combination)
- † Aclis minor G. Seguenza, 1876: synonym of † Aclis latior G. Seguenza, 1876 (invalid: junior secondary homonym of Aclis minor (Brown, 1827) )
- Aclis mizon Watson, 1881: synonym of Costaclis mizon (Watson, 1881)
- Aclis monolirata de Folin, 1873: synonym of Ebalina monolirata (de Folin, 1873)
- Aclis muchia Locard, 1896: synonym of Costaclis mizon (Watson, 1881)
- † Aclis neglecta A. W. Janssen, 1969: synonym of† Cima neglecta (A. W. Janssen, 1969) (original combination)
- Aclis nucleata Dall, 1889: synonym of Costaclis hyalina (Watson, 1881)
- Aclis occidentalis (Hemphill, 1894): synonym of Murchisonella occidentalis (Hemphill, 1894)
- Aclis pellucida Gatliff & Gabriel, 1911: synonym of Graphis pellucida (Gatliff & Gabriel, 1911) (original combination)
- Aclis pendata Dall, 1927: synonym of Aclis stilifer Dall, 1927
- Aclis polita A. E. Verrill, 1872: synonym of Eulimella polita (A. E. Verrill, 1872)
- † Aclis proneglecta R. Janssen, 1978: synonym of † Cima proneglecta (R. Janssen, 1978) † (original combination)
- Aclis rhyssa Dall, 1927: synonym of Graphis rhyssa (Dall, 1927) (superseded combination)
- Aclis scalaris (Talavera, 1975): synonym of Aclis talaverai Brunetti & Cresti, 2018
- Aclis semireticulata Murdoch & Suter, 1906: synonym of Pusillina semireticulata (Murdoch & Suter, 1906): synonym of Haurakia semireticulata (Murdoch & Suter, 1906) (superseded combination)
- Aclis simillima E. A. Smith, 1890: synonym of Ebala simillima (E. A. Smith, 1890) (superseded combination)
- Aclis striata A. E. Verrill, 1880: synonym of Odostomia striata (A. E. Verrill, 1880)
- Aclis succincta Suter, 1908: synonym of Brookesena succincta (Suter, 1908)
- Aclis supranitida (S. V. Wood, 1842): synonym of Aclis minor (Brown, 1827)
- Aclis tanneri (Bartsch, 1947): synonym of Aclis tenuis A. E. Verrill, 1882
- Aclis tenuistriata G. B. Sowerby III, 1892: synonym of Acliceratia tenuistriata (G. B. Sowerby III, 1892)
- Aclis tricarinata Watson, 1897: synonym of Pseudoscilla bilirata (de Folin, 1870)
- Aclis trilirata de Folin, 1872: synonym of Pyramidelloides triliratus (de Folin, 1873)
- † Aclis turella Fenaux, 1938: synonym of † Bouryiscala turella (Fenaux, 1938) (unaccepted > superseded combination)
- Aclis turrita (Carpenter, 1864): synonym of Alabina turrita (P. P. Carpenter, 1866)
- Aclis turrita Petterd, 1884 : synonym of Koloonella turrita (Petterd, 1884) (original combination)
- Aclis unica (Montagu, 1803): synonym of Graphis albida (Kanmacher, 1798) (superseded combination, also subjective junior synonym)
- Aclis ventrosa Friele, 1876: synonym of Hemiaclis ventrosa (Friele, 1876)
- Aclis venusta de Folin, 1872 : synonym of Pyramidellidae incertae sedis venusta (de Folin, 1872)
- Aclis verduini van Aartsen, Menkhorst & Gittenberger, 1984: synonym of Aclis trilineata R. B. Watson, 1897
- Aclis verrilli Bartsch, 1911: synonym of Aclis tenuis A. E. Verrill, 1882
- Aclis vixornata de Folin, 1878: synonym of Ebalina vixornata (de Folin, 1878)
