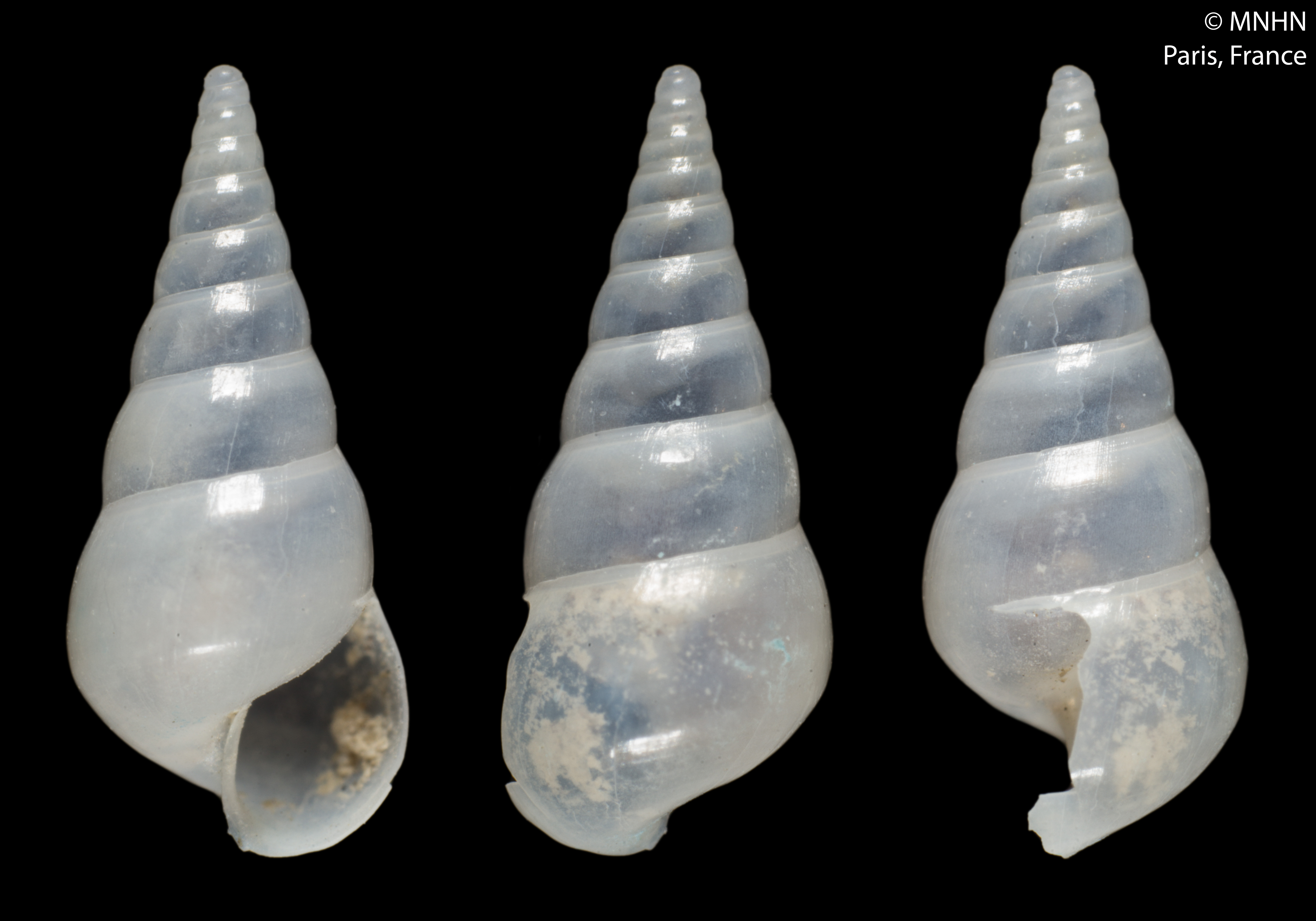
- Shell of Hemiaclis obtusa

Scientific classification
- Kingdom: Animalia
- Phylum: Mollusca
- Class: Gastropoda
- Subclass: Caenogastropoda
- Order: Littorinimorpha
- Superfamily: Vanikoroidea
- Family: Eulimidae
- Genus: Hemiaclis; G.O. Sars, 1878

Type species
- Aclis ventrosa Friele, 1876

= Hemiaclis =

Genus of sea snails

Hemiaclis is a genus of sea snails, marine gastropod mollusks in the family Eulimidae.

== Species ==
Species within this genus include the following:

- Hemiaclis carolinensis (Bartsch, 1911)
- Hemiaclis georgiana (Dall, 1927)
- Hemiaclis incolorata (Thiele, 1912)
- Hemiaclis katrinae (Engl, 2006)
- Hemiaclis major (Bouchet & Warén, 1986)
- Hemiaclis obtusa (Bouchet & Warén, 1986)
- Hemiaclis ventrosa (Friele, 1874)

Species brought into synonymy

- Hemiaclis aqabaensis (Bandel, 2005): synonym of Murchisonella aqabaensis (Bandel, 2005)
- Hemiaclis dalli (Bartsch, 1911) : synonym of Aclis sarissa (Watson, 1881)
- Hemiaclis fernandinae (Dall, 1927): synonym of Aclis tenuis A. E. Verrill, 1882
- Hemiaclis glabra (G.O. Sars, 1878) : synonym of Hemiaclis ventrosa (Friele, 1874)
- Hemiaclis lata (Dall, 1927): synonym of Umbilibalcis lata (Dall, 1889)
- Hemiaclis marguerita (Bartsch, 1947) : synonym of Aclis marguerita (Bartsch, 1947)
- Hemiaclis obtusus (Bouchet & Warén, 1986) : synonym of Hemiaclis obtusus (Bouchet & Warén, 1986)
- Hemiaclis tanneri (Bartsch, 1947) : synonym of Aclis tanneri (Bartsch, 1947)
- Hemiaclis ventrosus (Friele, 1876) : synonym of Hemiaclis ventrosa (Friele, 1874)
