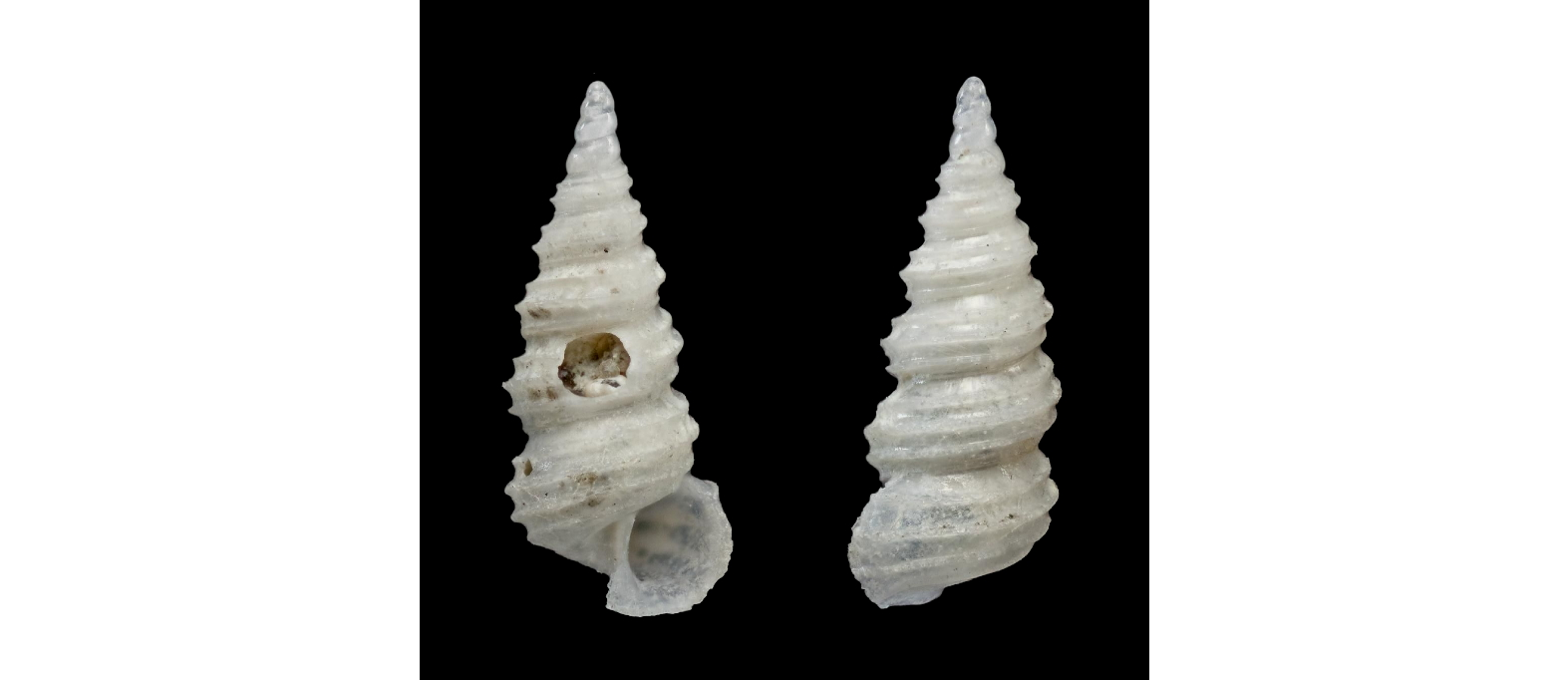
- Shell of Aclis thesauraria (holotype at the Natural History Museum, London))

Scientific classification
- Kingdom: Animalia
- Phylum: Mollusca
- Class: Gastropoda
- Subclass: Caenogastropoda
- Order: Littorinimorpha
- Superfamily: Vanikoroidea
- Family: Eulimidae
- Genus: Aclis
- Species: A. thesauraria

Binomial name
- Aclis thesauraria Melvill, 1904

= Aclis thesauraria =

Species of gastropod

Aclis thesauraria is a species of sea snail, a marine gastropod mollusk in the family Eulimidae.

This is a taxon inquirendum (use in recent literature not established by editor)

== Description ==
The length of the shell attains 2.5 mm, its diameter 1 mm.

(Original description) The very small, white shell has an ovate-fusiform shape. It contains nine whorls. The 3 1/2 apical whorls are almost caudate, three to four of almost uniform narrow build, quite smooth and glossy. The remainder are uniformly acutely keeled. The aperture is round. The thickened peristome with a squarish extension of the columellar base, half hides the narrow umbilicus.

In sculpture it shows kinship with Aclis ascaris (Turton, 1819).

== Distribution ==
This minute marine species occurs in the Gulf of Oman.
