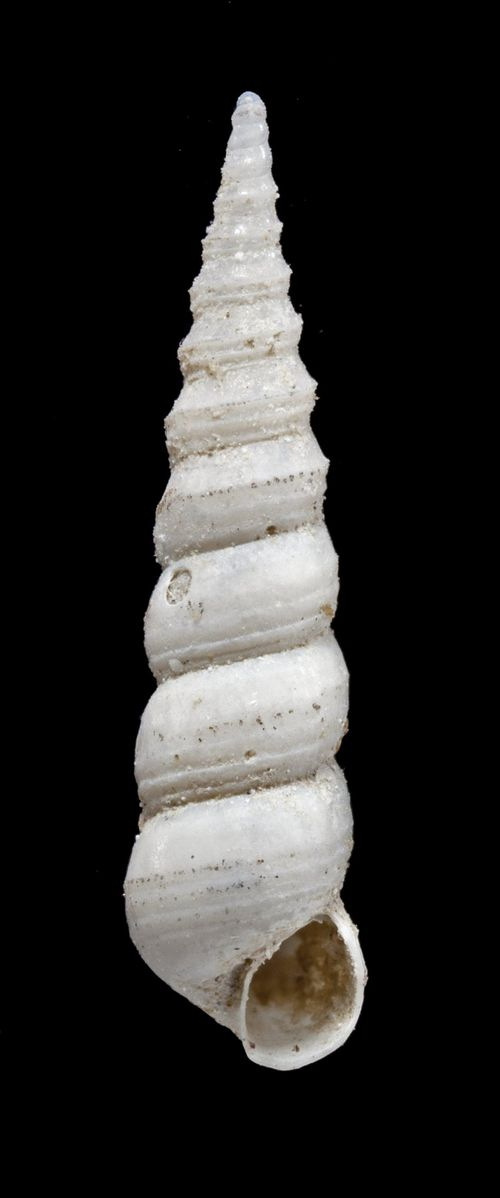
- Shell of Aclis lirata (specimen at the Natural History Museum, London)

Scientific classification
- Kingdom: Animalia
- Phylum: Mollusca
- Class: Gastropoda
- Subclass: Caenogastropoda
- Order: Littorinimorpha
- Superfamily: Vanikoroidea
- Family: Eulimidae
- Genus: Aclis
- Species: A. lirata

Binomial name
- Aclis lirata A. Adams, 1860

= Aclis lirata =

Species of gastropod

Aclis lirata is a species of sea snail, a marine gastropod mollusk in the family Eulimidae.

This is a taxon inquirendum (use in recent literature not established by editor)

== Distribution ==
This species occurs in the Sea of Japan.
