= Aclis dumasi =

Scientific classification
- Kingdom: Animalia
- Phylum: Mollusca
- Class: Gastropoda
- Subclass: Caenogastropoda
- Order: Littorinimorpha
- Superfamily: Vanikoroidea
- Family: Eulimidae
- Genus: Aclis
- Species: A. dumasi

Binomial name
- Aclis dumasi de Boury, 1902

Synonyms
- Trochus dumasi Cossmann, 1902

Species of gastropod

Aclis dumasi is an extinct species of sea snail, a marine gastropod mollusk in the family Eulimidae.

This is a taxon inquirendum.

== Description ==
The length of the shell attains 13 mm, its diameter is 9 mm.

== Distribution ==
Fossils of this species were found in Loire-Atlantique, France.
