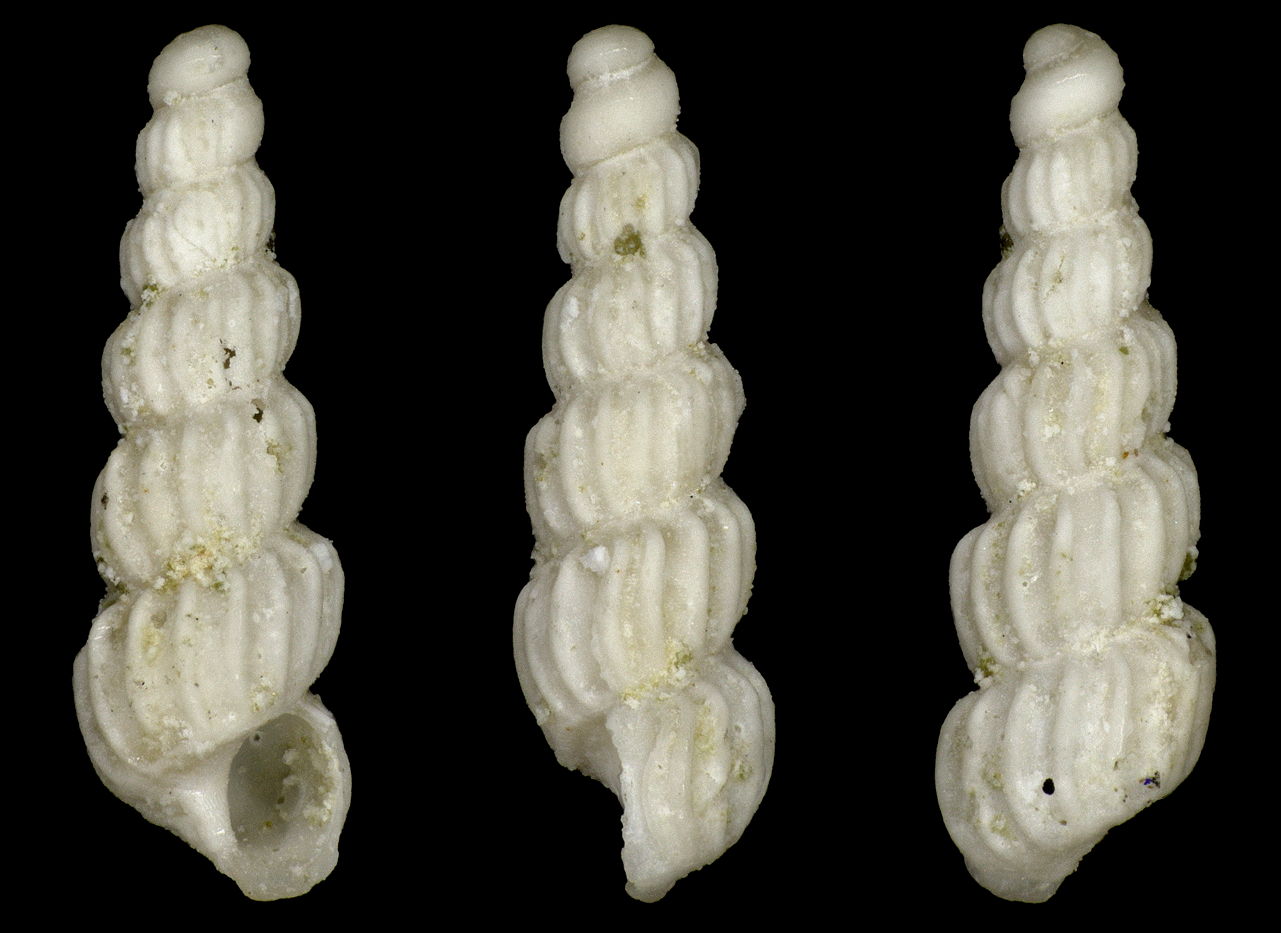
- Shell of Aclis minutissima (specimen at the Natural History Museum, Paris)

Scientific classification
- Kingdom: Animalia
- Phylum: Mollusca
- Class: Gastropoda
- Subclass: Caenogastropoda
- Order: Littorinimorpha
- Superfamily: Vanikoroidea
- Family: Eulimidae
- Genus: Aclis
- Species: A. minutissima

Binomial name
- Aclis minutissima R. B. Watson, 1886

= Aclis minutissima =

Species of gastropod

Aclis minutissima is a species of sea snail, a marine gastropod mollusk in the family Eulimidae.

This is a taxon inquirendum.

== Distribution ==
Fossils of this species were found near Yvelines, France.
