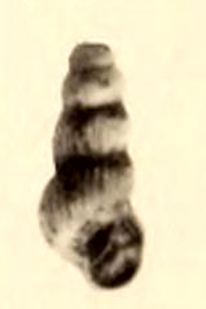
- Shell of Aclis dialytospira (holotype)

Scientific classification
- Kingdom: Animalia
- Phylum: Mollusca
- Class: Gastropoda
- Subclass: Caenogastropoda
- Order: Littorinimorpha
- Superfamily: Vanikoroidea
- Family: Eulimidae
- Genus: Aclis
- Species: A. dialytospira

Binomial name
- Aclis dialytospira de Boury, 1902

= Aclis dialytospira =

Species of gastropod

Aclis dialytospira is an extinct species of sea snail, a marine gastropod mollusk in the family Eulimidae.

This is a taxon inquirendum.

== Description ==
The length of the shell attained 3 mm.

== Distribution ==
Fossils of this species were found off Hauteville, France.
