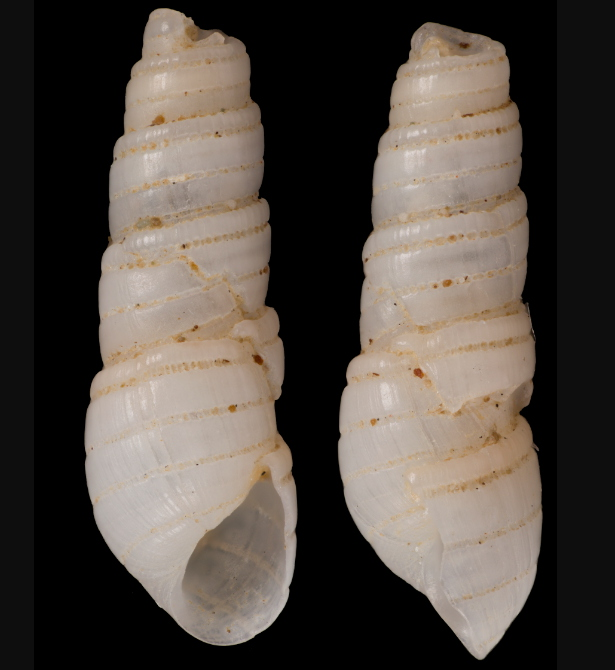
- Shell of Aclis crenulata (specimen at MNHN, Paris)

Scientific classification
- Kingdom: Animalia
- Phylum: Mollusca
- Class: Gastropoda
- Subclass: Caenogastropoda
- Order: Littorinimorpha
- Superfamily: Vanikoroidea
- Family: Eulimidae
- Genus: Aclis
- Species: A. crenulata

Binomial name
- Aclis crenulata de Folin, 1879

= Aclis crenulata =

Species of gastropod

Aclis crenulata is a species of sea snail, a marine gastropod mollusk in the family Eulimidae.

This is a taxon inquirendum.

== Distribution ==
This species occurs off the Andaman Islands, Bay of Bengal.
