= Aclis gallica =

Scientific classification
- Kingdom: Animalia
- Phylum: Mollusca
- Class: Gastropoda
- Subclass: Caenogastropoda
- Order: Littorinimorpha
- Superfamily: Vanikoroidea
- Family: Eulimidae
- Genus: Aclis
- Species: A. gallica

Binomial name
- Aclis gallica de Boury, 1912

Species of gastropod

Aclis gallica is an extinct species of sea snail, a marine gastropod mollusk in the family Eulimidae.

This is a taxon inquirendum.

== Variety ==
- † Aclis gallica var. cossmanni de Boury, 1912 (uncertain, status in recent literature not researched by editor)

== Description ==
The length of the shell attains 2.5 mm.

== Distribution ==
Fossils of this species were found in Oise, France.
