= Mangelia shepstonensis =

Scientific classification
- Kingdom: Animalia
- Phylum: Mollusca
- Class: Gastropoda
- Subclass: Caenogastropoda
- Order: Neogastropoda
- Superfamily: Conoidea
- Family: Mangeliidae
- Genus: Mangelia
- Species: M. shepstonensis

Binomial name
- Mangelia shepstonensis (E. A. Smith, 1914)

Synonyms
- Mangilia shepstonensis E. A. Smith, 1914

Species of gastropod

Mangelia shepstonensis is a species of sea snail, a marine gastropod mollusk in the family Mangeliidae.

This is a taxon inquirendum.

== Description ==
The length of the shell attains 4.3 mm, its diameter is 2 mm.

The shell closely resembles Lienardia siren (E. A. Smith, 1904) and Drillia tholos Barnard, 1958

== Distribution ==
This marine species occurs off Durban, South Africa.
