= Melanella vegrandis =

- Shell of Melanella vegrandis (original image)

Scientific classification
- Kingdom: Animalia
- Phylum: Mollusca
- Class: Gastropoda
- Subclass: Caenogastropoda
- Order: Littorinimorpha
- Superfamily: Vanikoroidea
- Family: Eulimidae
- Genus: Melanella
- Species: M. vegrandis

Binomial name
- Melanella vegrandis (Murdoch & Suter, 1906)

Synonyms
- Eulima vegrandis Murdoch & Suter, 1906 (superseded combination)

Species of gastropod

Melanella vegrandis is a species of sea snail, a marine gastropod mollusk in the family Eulimidae.

== Description ==
The length of the shell attains 7 mm; its diameter 2 mm.

(Original description) The small shell is awl-shaped, imperforate, straight, smooth, and glossy. The sculpture is absent, except for an occasional interrupted varix. The shell is white and porcellaneous.

The spire is straight, many-whorled, and narrowly elevated, terminating in a sharp, slender apex. The protoconch consists of about two smooth whorls, which are very slightly curved away from the axis of the shell; the nucleus is minute and rounded.

There are 11 whorls with straight sides. The body whorl is less than half the total length of the shell and is indistinctly angled at the periphery; the base is convex. The suture is linear and has a minutely submarginate appearance on the lower whorls.

The aperture is pyriform, angled above, and slightly oblique; it is rounded and slightly effuse at the base. The outer lip is lightly curved and thickened, with a weak sinus below its insertion. The inner lip is narrowly spread as a distinct callus from the outer lip across the body whorl and the slightly excavated columella; it is reflected and united with the effuse lower lip.

== Distribution ==
This marine species is endemic to New Zealand and occurs off North-eastern North Island, at depths between 201 m and 248 m.
