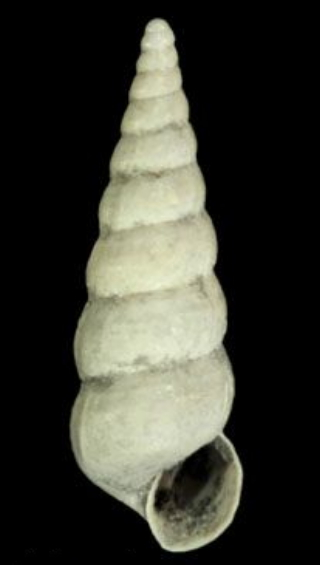
- Shell of Aclis walleri (specimen at the Natural History Museum, Rotterdam))

Scientific classification
- Kingdom: Animalia
- Phylum: Mollusca
- Class: Gastropoda
- Subclass: Caenogastropoda
- Order: Littorinimorpha
- Superfamily: Vanikoroidea
- Family: Eulimidae
- Genus: Aclis
- Species: A. walleri

Binomial name
- Aclis walleri Jeffreys, 1867

= Aclis walleri =

Species of sea snail

Aclis walleri is a species of sea snail, a marine gastropod mollusk in the family Eulimidae.

Varieties

- Aclis walleri var. carinata Norman, 1879: synonym of Aclis sarsi Dautzenberg & H. Fischer, 1912
- Aclis walleri var. sarsi Dautzenberg & H. Fischer, 1912: synonym of Aclis sarsi Dautzenberg & H. Fischer, 1912

== Distribution ==
This minute marine species occurs in the Atlantic Ocean off Norway, Shetland and the Azores.
