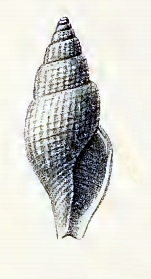
- Original image of a shell of Daphnella thia

Scientific classification
- Kingdom: Animalia
- Phylum: Mollusca
- Class: Gastropoda
- Subclass: Caenogastropoda
- Order: Neogastropoda
- Superfamily: Conoidea
- Family: Raphitomidae
- Genus: Daphnella
- Species: D. thia

Binomial name
- Daphnella thia Melvill & Standen, 1903

= Daphnella thia =

Species of gastropod

Daphnella thia is a species of sea snail, a marine gastropod mollusk in the family Raphitomidae.

This is a taxon inquirendum.

== Description ==
The length of the shell attains 9.5 mm, its diameter 3 mm.

The attenuate-fusiform shell has a slightly elongate spire. The shell contains eight whorls of which 3½ ochre-coloured whorls in the protoconch. The subsequent whorls are elegantly rounded. They are closely encircled with decussating lirae, a faint straw-coloured or golden tinge being sometimes observable on them. The body whorl is fairly tumid. The smallish aperture is oblong. The outer lip is thin. The sinus is wide but not deep. The short siphonal canal is only slightly produced. The shell shows a yellowish or golden tinge over the whole semi-pellucent surface.

== Distribution ==
This marine species occurs in the Persian Gulf and the Gulf of Oman .
