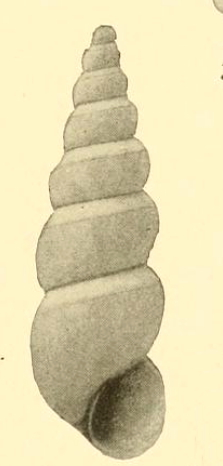
- Shell of Aclis floridana (holotype)

Scientific classification
- Kingdom: Animalia
- Phylum: Mollusca
- Class: Gastropoda
- Subclass: Caenogastropoda
- Order: Littorinimorpha
- Superfamily: Vanikoroidea
- Family: Eulimidae
- Genus: Aclis
- Species: A. floridana

Binomial name
- Aclis floridana Bartsch, 1911

= Aclis floridana =

Species of gastropod

Aclis floridana is a species of sea snail, a marine gastropod mollusk in the family Eulimidae.

== Description ==
The length of the shell attains 2.9 mm, its diameter 1 mm.

(Original description) The small shell is elongate-conic. The 1½ whorls of the protoconch are well rounded. The post-nuclear whorls are marked by a strong sloping shoulder which extends over the posterior fourth of the whorls between the sutures. This shoulder is limited anteriorly by a quite strong carina. The anterior three-fourths of the whorls between the sutures are well rounded, strongly constricted at the suture, and appear sculptured by several very feeble spiral lines. The axial sculpture consists of incremental lines and an occasional varical streak. The sutures are very strongly constricted. The periphery of the body whorl and the moderately long base are well rounded and marked like the spire. The posterior angle of the aperture is obtuse (the outer lip is fractured; the anterior portion of the columella lost). The parietal whorl is covered with a moderately thick callus which joins the columella with the posterior angle of the aperture.

== Distribution ==
This marine species occurs in the Straits of Florida.
