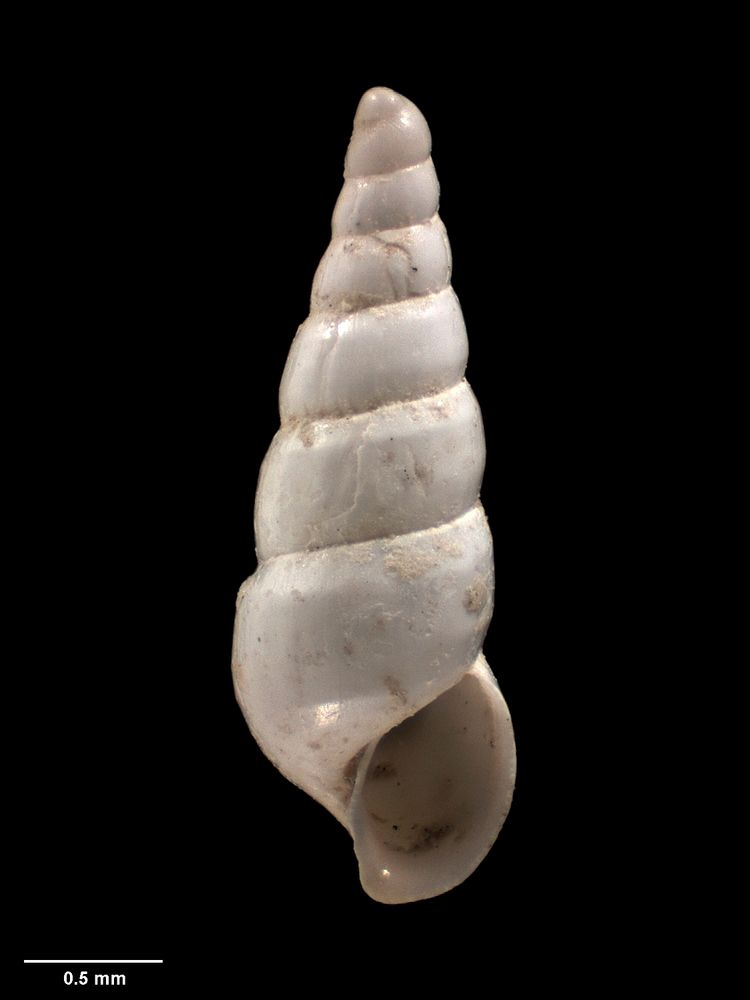
- Shell of Aclis subcarinata (holotype at the Museum of New Zealand))

Scientific classification
- Kingdom: Animalia
- Phylum: Mollusca
- Class: Gastropoda
- Subclass: Caenogastropoda
- Order: Littorinimorpha
- Superfamily: Vanikoroidea
- Family: Eulimidae
- Genus: Aclis
- Species: A. subcarinata

Binomial name
- Aclis subcarinata (Murdoch & Suter, 1906)

Synonyms
- Diala subcarinata Murdoch & Suter, 1906 (superseded combination)

= Aclis subcarinata =

Species of gastropod

Aclis subcarinata is a species of sea snail, a marine gastropod mollusk in the family Eulimidae.

== Description ==
The length of the shell attains 2.9 mm, its diameter 1.04 mm.

(Original description) The minute shell is subulate, smooth and narrowly perforate.

Sculpture: The longitudinals consist of minute growth-striae with here and there irregular marks of growth-periods. They are subcostate in places.

The colour of the shell is porcellaneous-white.

The spire is high, slender and tapering. The protoconch consists of about two smooth rounded whorls, the second with a slightly swollen aspect, the nucleus is oblique. The shell contains 7 slightly rounded whorls. The antipenultimate whorl is indistinctly feebly bicarinate. This is better defined upon the next whorl, especially the superior angle which forms the subtabular suturial shelf. Upon the last four or five there are feeble carinae, three of which are above the aperture, the base rounded. The suture is deep. The aperture is vertical and subtriangular. The outer lip is sharp, regularly curved, effuse and angled at the junction with the basal extension of the columella, producing a small spout-like siphonal canal. The inner lip forms a narrow thin callosity on the columella, which is subvertical and slightly sinuated. A thin callus extends above over the body to the outer lip. The open umbilicus is very narrow.

== Distribution ==
This marine species is endemic to New Zealand off North Cape and North Island east coast.
