= Aclis kanela =

Scientific classification
- Kingdom: Animalia
- Phylum: Mollusca
- Class: Gastropoda
- Subclass: Caenogastropoda
- Order: Littorinimorpha
- Superfamily: Vanikoroidea
- Family: Eulimidae
- Genus: Aclis
- Species: A. kanela

Binomial name
- Aclis kanela Absalão, 2009

Species of gastropod

Aclis kanela is a species of sea snail, a marine gastropod mollusk in the family Eulimidae.

== Description ==
The length of the shell attains 1.9 mm, its diameter 0.75 mm.

== Distribution ==
This minute marine species occurs in the Atlantic Ocean off Brazil. The species is demersal, with a depth range from 1043 - 1941 metres at 22°S - 23°S, 40°E - 40°S.

== life cycle ==
Aclis Kanela is a gonochoric and broadcast spawner. Embryos develop into planktonic trocophore larvae and later into juvenile veligers before becoming fully grown adults.
