= Aclis siberutensis =

Scientific classification
- Kingdom: Animalia
- Phylum: Mollusca
- Class: Gastropoda
- Subclass: Caenogastropoda
- Order: Littorinimorpha
- Superfamily: Vanikoroidea
- Family: Eulimidae
- Genus: Aclis
- Species: A. siberutensis

Binomial name
- Aclis siberutensis Thiele, 1925

Species of gastropod

Aclis siberutensis is a species of sea snail, a marine gastropod mollusk in the family Eulimidae.

== Distribution ==
This minute marine species occurs off Western Sumatra, Indonesia.
