= Melanella oxyacme =

- Shell of Melanella oxyacme

Scientific classification
- Kingdom: Animalia
- Phylum: Mollusca
- Class: Gastropoda
- Subclass: Caenogastropoda
- Order: Littorinimorpha
- Superfamily: Vanikoroidea
- Family: Eulimidae
- Genus: Melanella
- Species: M. oxyacme

Binomial name
- Melanella oxyacme (Suter, 1908)

Synonyms
- Eulima oxyacme Suter, 1908 (superseded combination)

Species of gastropod

Melanella oxyacme is a species of sea snail, a marine gastropod mollusk in the family Eulimidae.

== Description ==
The length of the shell attains 5.1 mm; its diameter 1.8 mm.

(Original description) The small shell is subulate, sharply pointed, pellucid, polished, straight, thin, and fragile. The sculpture consists solely of very fine, straight growth lines. The shell is white.

The spire is elevated-conical and has a sharp apex; it is not quite twice the height of the aperture, and its outlines are perfectly straight. The protoconch is minute and globose.

There are eight regularly increasing, flat whorls; the body whorl is high, and the base is somewhat flattened. The suture is linear and superficial, with a false margin below.

The aperture is subvertical, lanceolate, high, and narrow; it is narrowly angled above and acuminate below. The outer lip is slightly convex, very thin, and sharp. The basal lip is very narrowly rounded and slightly produced. The columella is vertical and straight, narrowing to a point below. The parietal wall is concave below and convex above.

== Distribution ==
This marine species is endemic to New Zealand and occurs off North-eastern North Island, at 70 m.
