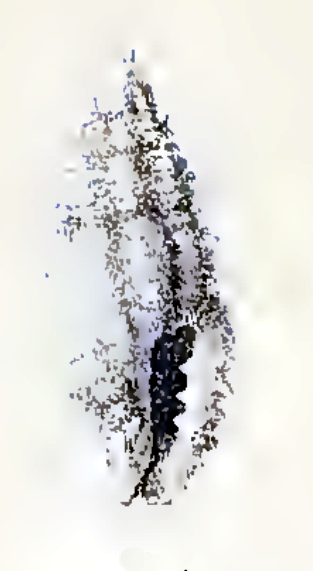
- Original image of a shell of Mangelia thepalea

Scientific classification
- Kingdom: Animalia
- Phylum: Mollusca
- Class: Gastropoda
- Subclass: Caenogastropoda
- Order: Neogastropoda
- Superfamily: Conoidea
- Family: Mangeliidae
- Genus: Mangelia
- Species: M. thepalea

Binomial name
- Mangelia thepalea Melvill, J.C. & R. Standen, 1897, "1896"

Synonyms
- Mangilia (Glyphostoma) thepalea Melvill, J.C. & R. Standen, 1897, "1896" (original combination)

= Mangelia thepalea =

Species of gastropod

Mangelia thepalea is a species of sea snail, a marine gastropod mollusk in the family Mangeliidae.

This is a taxon inquirendum.

== Description ==
The length of this shell attains 5.5 mm, its diameter 2 mm.

(Original description) This is a very delicate, beautiful little shell. The white shell is pyramidally spindle-shaped. It contains seven whorls, the two in the protoconch being glassy and apical. The subsequent are ventricose and impressed at the sutures. The longitudinal ribs are nodulous, shining, and very regular. One spiral sulcation crosses each rib in the middle. The interstices between are beautifully longitudinally striolate. At the sutures, and in the middle of the body whorl (in some specimens also on the upper whorls), there is a very pale ochraceous banding, the nodules of the ribs still retaining their white lustre. In other specimens the first three or four whorls remain quite colourless. The aperture is oblong. The sinus is sutural, obliquely extending over the outer lip, which is much incrassate within with seven prominent denticles, these being provided with three also of lesser size.

== Distribution ==
This marine species occurs off the Loyalty Islands .
