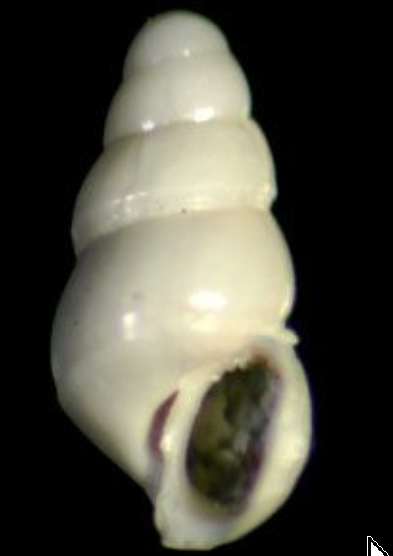
- Shell of Aclis sarsi (specimen at the Natural History Museum, Rotterdam)

Scientific classification
- Kingdom: Animalia
- Phylum: Mollusca
- Class: Gastropoda
- Subclass: Caenogastropoda
- Order: Littorinimorpha
- Superfamily: Vanikoroidea
- Family: Eulimidae
- Genus: Aclis
- Species: A. sarsi

Binomial name
- Aclis sarsi Dautzenberg & H. Fischer, 1912

Synonyms
- Aclis walleri var. carinata Norman, 1879; Aclis walleri var. sarsi Dautzenberg & H. Fischer, 1912 ·

= Aclis sarsi =

Species of gastropod

Aclis sarsi is a species of sea snail, a marine gastropod mollusk in the family Eulimidae.

== Description ==
The length of the shell varies between 2 mm and 3 mm.

== Distribution ==
This marine species occurs in the North Atlantic Ocean off Norway, Iceland, the Faroe Islands and the Azores; also off Morocco.
