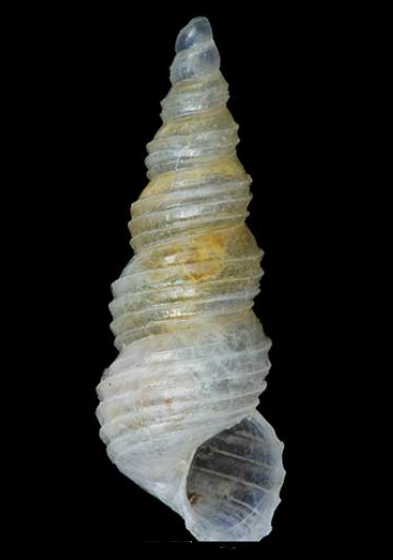
- Shell of Aclis pseudopareora (holotype at the Museum of New Zealand))

Scientific classification
- Kingdom: Animalia
- Phylum: Mollusca
- Class: Gastropoda
- Subclass: Caenogastropoda
- Order: Littorinimorpha
- Superfamily: Vanikoroidea
- Family: Eulimidae
- Genus: Aclis
- Species: A. pseudopareora

Binomial name
- Aclis pseudopareora A. W. B. Powell, 1940

= Aclis pseudopareora =

Species of gastropod

Aclis pseudopareora is a species of sea snail, a marine gastropod mollusk in the family Eulimidae.

== Description ==
The length of the shell may reach up to 3.2 mm, and its diameter up to 1.2 mm.

== Distribution ==
This marine species is endemic to New Zealand and occurs from the waters off of Northland's east coast to northern South Island at 18 to 84 meters below sea level.
