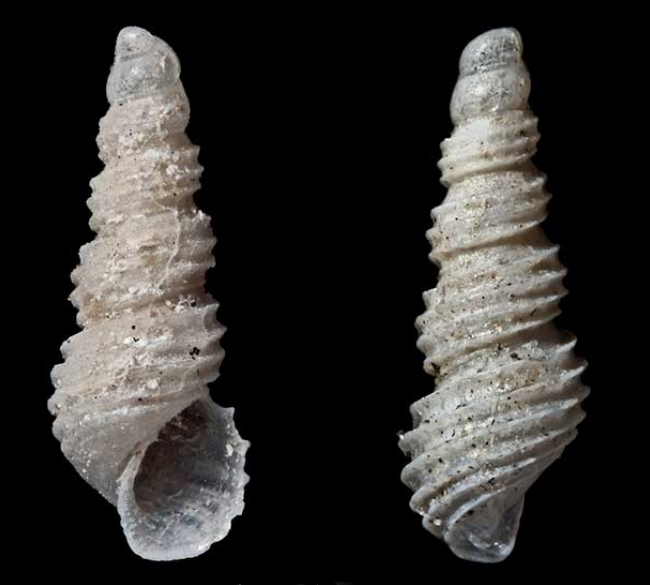
- Shell of Aclis terebra (holotype at the Museum of New Zealand))

Scientific classification
- Kingdom: Animalia
- Phylum: Mollusca
- Class: Gastropoda
- Subclass: Caenogastropoda
- Order: Littorinimorpha
- Superfamily: Vanikoroidea
- Family: Eulimidae
- Genus: Aclis
- Species: A. terebra

Binomial name
- Aclis terebra (A. W. B. Powell, 1930)

Synonyms
- Icuncula terebra A. W. B. Powell, 1930 (superseded combination)

= Aclis terebra =

Species of gastropod

Aclis terebra is a species of sea snail, a marine gastropod mollusk in the family Eulimidae.

== Description ==
The length of the shell attains 2.5 mm, its diameter 0.8 mm.

(Original description) The shell is small, fragile, tall, and remarkably slender (gracile). The color is pure white.

The shell consists of 6 whorls in total. The protoconch is large and smooth, composed of two strongly convex whorls. The spire is tall, approximately 2¼ times the height of the aperture. The outline of the post-nuclear whorls is strongly convex.

The post-nuclear sculpture is dominated by prominently raised, narrow spiral ridges (lirae). The first post-nuclear whorl bears three such ridges. A fourth, weaker spiral ridge emerges just above the lower suture on the following whorl, gradually increasing in strength. The body whorl displays four strong spiral ridges above the aperture. A fifth spiral originates from the lower suture and is followed basally by a sixth spiral, which is less prominent than those superior to it. The lower base is smooth, save for a slight ridge bordering the umbilical cleft.

The aperture is large and ovate. The peristome is discontinuous and thin. The outer lip is denticulate (toothed) by the terminations of the exterior spiral ridges. The basal lip is thin and dilated, merging superiorly into the obliquely arcuate columella.

A narrow umbilical cleft separates the columella from the base. The actual umbilical perforation is obscured by the overhanging, superior portion of the columella.

== Distribution ==
This marine species is endemic to New Zealand and occurs off the Poor Knights Islands.
