= Melanella monterosatoi =

- Shell of Melanella monterosatoi (specimen at the Natural History Museum, Rotterdam)

Scientific classification
- Kingdom: Animalia
- Phylum: Mollusca
- Class: Gastropoda
- Subclass: Caenogastropoda
- Order: Littorinimorpha
- Superfamily: Vanikoroidea
- Family: Eulimidae
- Genus: Melanella
- Species: M. monterosatoi

Binomial name
- Melanella monterosatoi (Monterosato, 1890)

Synonyms
- Acicularia monterosatoi Monterosato, 1890 (original combination); Balcis monterosatoi (Monterosato, 1890); Eulima (Vitreolina) monterosatoi (Monterosato, 1890); Eulima distorta var. gracilis Forbes & Hanley, 1853; Eulima monterosatoi (Monterosato, 1890); Polygireulima monterosatoi (Monterosato, 1890) ·

Species of gastropod

Melanella monterosatoi is a species of sea snail, a marine gastropod mollusk in the family Eulimidae.

== Description ==
The length of the shell attains 4.5 mm.

== Distribution ==
This species occurs in the North Sea and the Mediterranean Sea.
