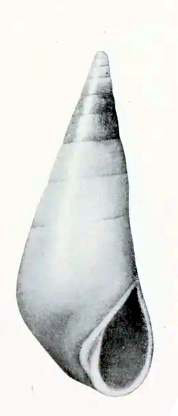
- Shell of Melanella tacomaensis (original image)

Scientific classification
- Kingdom: Animalia
- Phylum: Mollusca
- Class: Gastropoda
- Subclass: Caenogastropoda
- Order: Littorinimorpha
- Family: Eulimidae
- Genus: Melanella
- Species: M. tacomaensis

Binomial name
- Melanella tacomaensis Bartsch, 1917

Synonyms
- Melanella (Melanella) tacomaensis Bartsch, 1917 superseded combination

= Melanella tacomaensis =

Species of gastropod

Melanella tacomaensis is a species of sea snail, a marine gastropod mollusk in the family Eulimidae. The species is one of many species known to exist within the genus, Melanella.

This is a taxon inquirendum.

== Description ==
The length of the shell attains 5 mm, its diameter 2.1 mm.

(Or!ginal description) The small shell is straight, and broadly elongate-conic in outline. It is bluish-white in color, except where the animal shines through, where it appears golden brown. The surface is marked by exceedingly fine lines of growth and by almost invisible microscopic spiral striations.

The shell contains 10 whorls. The whorls are flattened and are separated by a scarcely defined suture; the basal portion of the preceding whorl shines through the substance of the succeeding turn, appearing as a conspicuous false suture. The periphery is obscurely angulated, while the base is short and flattened, with its left margin sloping very obliquely.

The aperture is moderately large, with an acute posterior angle. The outer lip is very thick within but thin at the edge, and it is decidedly protracted a little anterior to the middle, between the posterior angle and the base. The inner lip is very stout and somewhat flexuose, being reflected over and appressed to the base. The parietal wall is covered with a thick callus.

== Distribution ==
This species occurs off the Pacific coast of Tacoma, Washington, USA.
