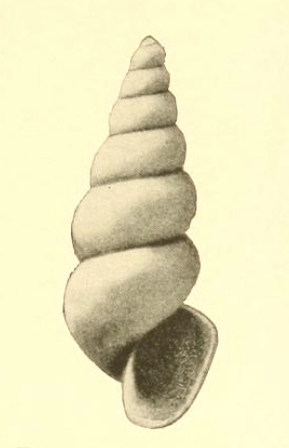
- Shell of Aclis rushi (holotype)

Scientific classification
- Kingdom: Animalia
- Phylum: Mollusca
- Class: Gastropoda
- Subclass: Caenogastropoda
- Order: Littorinimorpha
- Superfamily: Vanikoroidea
- Family: Eulimidae
- Genus: Aclis
- Species: A. rushi

Binomial name
- Aclis rushi Bartsch, 1911

= Aclis rushi =

Species of gastropod

Aclis rushi is a species of sea snail, a marine gastropod mollusk in the family Eulimidae.

== Description ==
The length of the shell attains 2.7 mm, its diameter 1.2 mm.

(Original description) The small, white shell is elongate-conic. The two whorls of the protoconch are well rounded and smooth. The post-nuclear whorls are inflated, appressed at the summit, sculptured with fine incremental lines and an occasional impressed varical streak. In addition to this there appear five very fine subobsolete raised spiral threads between the sutures which lend the surface a very weakly malleated appearance. The sutures are very strongly constricted. The periphery of the body whorl is well rounded. The base of the shell is moderately long, narrowly umbilicated, well rounded and marked like the spire. The aperture is large, decidedly effuse anteriorly, with a patulous expansion covering the posterior half of the outer lip. The posterior angle is obtuse. The outer lip is thin, the portion immediately anterior to the patulous part forming a claw. The columella is very long, oblique, and very strongly reflected.

== Distribution ==
This marine species occurs in the Straits of Florida.
