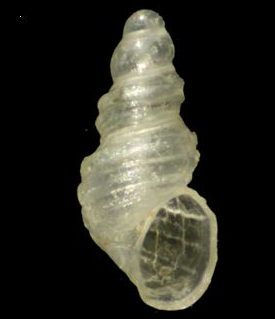
- Shell of Aclis trilineata (holotype at the Natural History Museum, Rotterdam))

Scientific classification
- Kingdom: Animalia
- Phylum: Mollusca
- Class: Gastropoda
- Subclass: Caenogastropoda
- Order: Littorinimorpha
- Superfamily: Vanikoroidea
- Family: Eulimidae
- Genus: Aclis
- Species: A. trilineata

Binomial name
- Aclis trilineata R. B. Watson, 1897

Synonyms
- Aclis verduini van Aartsen, Menkhorst & Gittenberger, 1984; Pherusa carinata Chaster, 1896 ·

= Aclis trilineata =

Species of gastropod

Aclis trilineata is a species of sea snail, a marine gastropod mollusk in the family Eulimidae.

== Description ==
The length of the shell attains 1.2 mm.

(Original description) The thinnish shell is semitransparent, rather glossy, longish, narrow with squarish outlines.

Sculpture: there are on each whorl 3 very strong rounded but slightly crested threads, absent on the embryonic tip, faint on the two succeeding whorls but well-marked on all the others — no others appear on the base. The first, which is the strongest, lies a little remote from the suture and forms for the whorl a well-marked shoulder0 The second, helped by the bulge of the whorl, is barely more prominent than the first. The third is slightly feebler than the others, and less near but quite clear of the suture. Besides these there are faint close-set microscopic striations and vaguer traces of longitudinal markings. The furrows between the threads are shallow and rounded.

The colour of the shell is white and semitransparent.

The spire is high and narrow, ending a little abruptly in a small rounded, not prominent tip. The shell contains 6 1/2 whorls. From the suture there is a downward sloping shoulder to the first thread, from which the very straight contourline runs down parallel to the axis, and with scarcely any contraction into the suture below. The suture is broad, open, and shallow, rather oblique. The aperture is oval and rather large. The outer lip is thin, with a free convex sweep. The inner lip is thin, sharp, and prominent, with a well-rounded curve it spreads very thinly across the body. The umbilicus is shallow, small and funnel-shaped.

== Distribution ==
This minute marine species occurs in the Atlantic Ocean off Madeira and off Algeciras, Spain.
