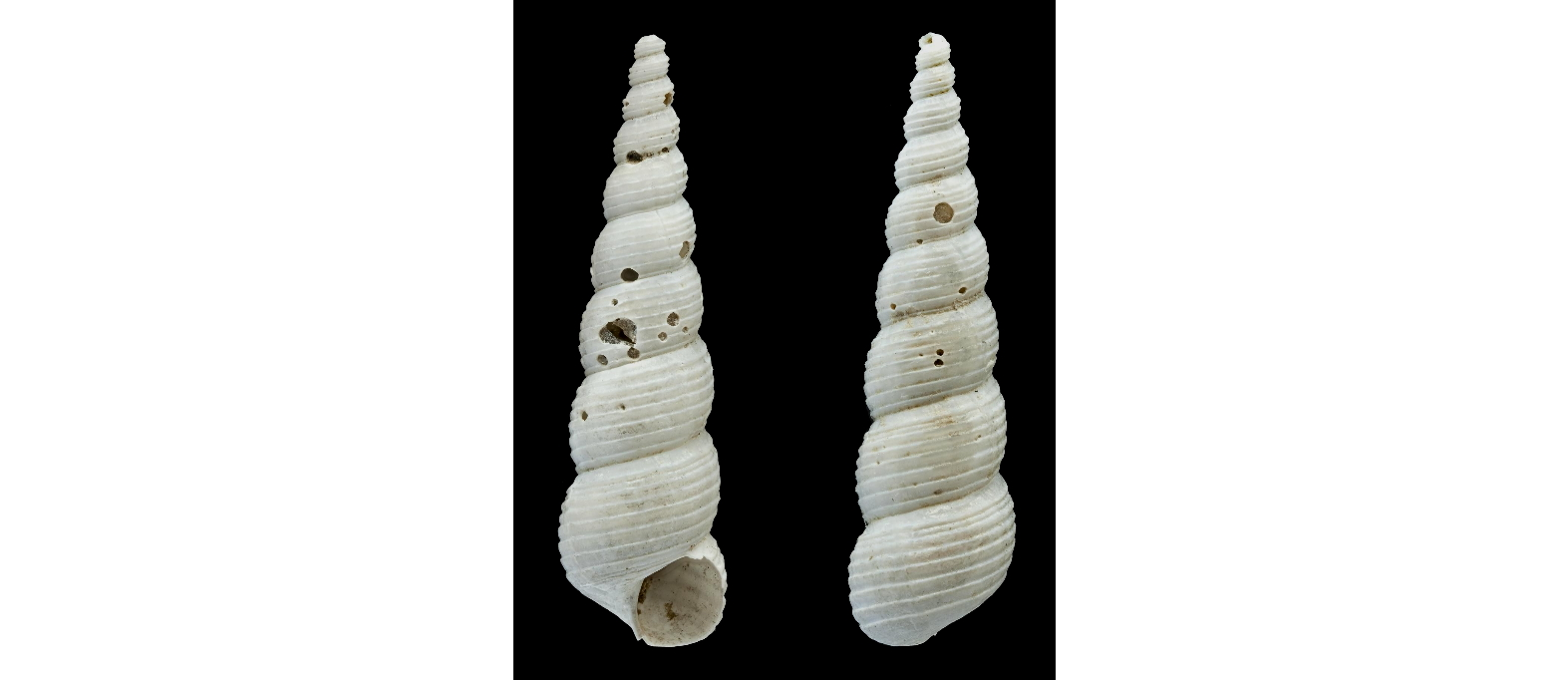
- Shell of Aclis loveniana (specimen at the Natural History Museum, London)

Scientific classification
- Kingdom: Animalia
- Phylum: Mollusca
- Class: Gastropoda
- Subclass: Caenogastropoda
- Order: Littorinimorpha
- Superfamily: Vanikoroidea
- Family: Eulimidae
- Genus: Aclis
- Species: A. loveniana

Binomial name
- Aclis loveniana A. Adams, 1861

= Aclis loveniana =

Species of gastropod

Aclis loveniana is a species of sea snail, a marine gastropod mollusk in the family Eulimidae.

== Distribution ==
This species occurs in the Sea of Japan.
