= Aclis hendersoni =

Scientific classification
- Kingdom: Animalia
- Phylum: Mollusca
- Class: Gastropoda
- Subclass: Caenogastropoda
- Order: Littorinimorpha
- Superfamily: Vanikoroidea
- Family: Eulimidae
- Genus: Aclis
- Species: A. hendersoni

Binomial name
- Aclis hendersoni Dall, 1927

Synonyms
- Schwengelia hendersoni (Dall, 1927) ·

Species of gastropod

Aclis hendersoni is a species of sea snail, a marine gastropod mollusk in the family Eulimidae.

== Description ==
The length of the shell attains 4.3 mm, its diameter 1.3 mm.

(Original description) The small shell is translucent white. It contains two transparent apical whorls and seven subsequent whorls. The suture is deep. The early whorls show two peripheral elevated threads, later four, then on the last three whorls the posterior thread becomes a well defined keel at the shoulder while the other threads become obsolete. The base is well rounded and imperforate. The axial sculpture shows faint incremental lines. The aperture is obliquely ovate. The peristome is expanded and even somewhat reflected, thin and simple.

== Distribution ==
This species occurs in the Atlantic Ocean off Fernandina Beach, Florida and Georgia, USA
