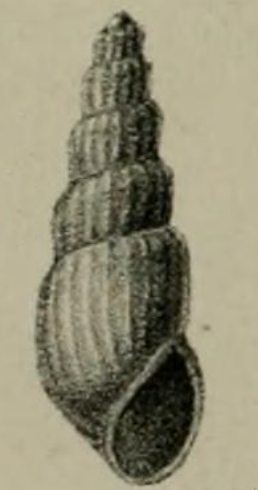
- Shell of Aclis didyma (holotype)

Scientific classification
- Kingdom: Animalia
- Phylum: Mollusca
- Class: Gastropoda
- Subclass: Caenogastropoda
- Order: Littorinimorpha
- Superfamily: Vanikoroidea
- Family: Eulimidae
- Genus: Aclis
- Species: A. didyma

Binomial name
- Aclis didyma E. A. Smith, 1890

= Aclis didyma =

Species of gastropod

Aclis didyma is a species of sea snail, a marine gastropod mollusk in the family Eulimidae.

== Description ==
The length of the shell attains 2.5 mm, its diameter 0.66 mm.

== Distribution ==
This species occurs in the Atlantic Ocean off Saint Helena.
