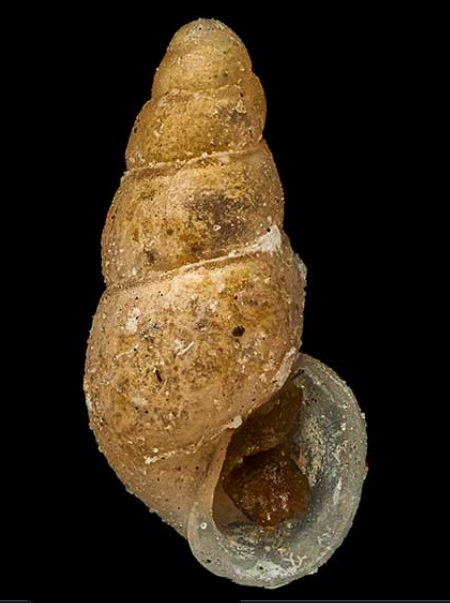
- Shell of Aclis expansa (holotype at the Museum of New Zealand))

Scientific classification
- Kingdom: Animalia
- Phylum: Mollusca
- Class: Gastropoda
- Subclass: Caenogastropoda
- Order: Littorinimorpha
- Superfamily: Vanikoroidea
- Family: Eulimidae
- Genus: Aclis
- Species: A. expansa

Binomial name
- Aclis expansa (A. W. B. Powell, 1930)

Synonyms
- Eusetia expansa (A. W. B. Powell, 1930) (superseded combination); Rissopsis expansa A. W. B. Powell, 1930 (superseded combination)

= Aclis expansa =

Species of gastropod

Aclis expansa is a species of sea snail, a marine gastropod mollusk in the family Eulimidae.

== Description ==
The holotype measures 1.45 mm in height and 0.7 mm in diameter.

(Original description) The shell is minute, thin, and semitransparent, with a smooth, glossy surface and a pale buff coloration. Its spire is tall, reaching almost twice the height of the aperture, and terminates in a bluntly rounded apex. The shell comprises five whorls, including the visible portion of the heterostrophic protoconch, which is not distinctly separated from the post-nuclear whorls. The initial whorl of the protoconch is partially immersed within the volution of the succeeding whorl. The outlines of the spire whorls are slightly convex, while the body whorl and base are evenly rounded.

The aperture is expanded, oblique, and rhomboidal in shape, becoming protractive below. The peristome is discontinuous and slightly thickened, though not variced. The outer lip is convexly arcuate, projecting prominently from the body whorl at a broad angle; it is sub-angled above and broadly rounded below. The inner lip forms a connecting callus across the parietal wall and resolves below into a slightly sinuous, rounded, and thickened columella, which remains free from the base before merging into the rounded basal lip.

The suture is impressed and appears strongly false-margined below, an effect produced by the coiling of the shell and its semitransparency.

== Distribution ==
This marine species is endemic to New Zealand and occurs off Northland.
