= Melanella luchuana =

- Shell of Melanella luchuana (original image)

Scientific classification
- Kingdom: Animalia
- Phylum: Mollusca
- Class: Gastropoda
- Subclass: Caenogastropoda
- Order: Littorinimorpha
- Superfamily: Vanikoroidea
- Family: Eulimidae
- Genus: Melanella
- Species: M. luchuana

Binomial name
- Melanella luchuana (Pilsbry, 1901)

Synonyms
- Eulima luchuana Pilsbry, 1901

Species of gastropod

Melanella luchuana is a species of sea snail, a marine gastropod mollusk in the family Eulimidae.

== Description ==
The length of the shell attains 12 mm, its diameter 3.85 mm.

(Original description) The shell is white and glossy. it is conic and curved slightly to the right, with that margin being almost straight while the left side is a little convex. It is regularly tapering, with 9 whorls remaining (the apex being decollate). The whorls are slightly convex, with the penultimate whorl having an impressed varix-line at its last sixth, the preceding whorl having one in line with the peristome, and the next earlier whorl having a varix-line corresponding in position to that on the penultimate whorl; the varices are thus all on the right or incurved side. The aperture is ovate-acuminate, and the outer lip is a little obtuse.

== Distribution ==
This marine species occurs off Japan.
