= Melanella luminosa =

- Shell of Melanella luminosa (original image)

Scientific classification
- Kingdom: Animalia
- Phylum: Mollusca
- Class: Gastropoda
- Subclass: Caenogastropoda
- Order: Littorinimorpha
- Superfamily: Vanikoroidea
- Family: Eulimidae
- Genus: Melanella
- Species: M. luminosa

Binomial name
- Melanella luminosa B. A. Marshall, 1997

Species of gastropod

Melanella luminosa is a species of sea snail, a marine gastropod mollusk in the family Eulimidae.

== Description ==
The length of the shell attains 5.75 mm, its diameter 2.25 mm.

== Distribution ==
This marine species is endemic to New Zealand and accors off South-western South Island, Stewart Island and Chatham Islands, at depths between 0 mm and-238 m.
