= Aclis bitaeniata =

Scientific classification
- Kingdom: Animalia
- Phylum: Mollusca
- Class: Gastropoda
- Subclass: Caenogastropoda
- Order: Littorinimorpha
- Superfamily: Vanikoroidea
- Family: Eulimidae
- Genus: Aclis
- Species: A. bitaeniata

Binomial name
- Aclis bitaeniata G. B. Sowerby III, 1903

Species of gastropod

Aclis bitaeniata is a species of sea snail, a marine gastropod mollusk in the family Eulimidae.

== Description ==
The length of the shell attains 9.5 mm, its diameter 2 mm.

(Original description) A little shell with an elongate narrow shape. It is coloured with two clearly defined linear bands on each whorl. The nine, slightly convex whorls, particularly the upper ones, are very obliquely coiled. With the exception of the smooth, apical ones they are finely, spirally grooved. The protoconch is small, pellucid, and sinistral. The aperture is subovate. The outer lip is thin.The columella is simple and has a slight sinistral twist.

== Distribution ==
This minute marine species occurs in the Sea of Japan.
