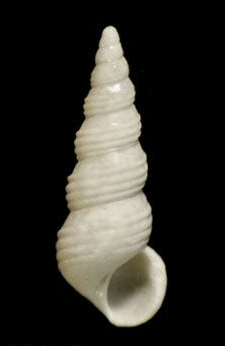
- Shell of Aclis ascaris (specimen at the Natural History Museum, Rotterdam)

Scientific classification
- Kingdom: Animalia
- Phylum: Mollusca
- Class: Gastropoda
- Subclass: Caenogastropoda
- Order: Littorinimorpha
- Superfamily: Vanikoroidea
- Family: Eulimidae
- Genus: Aclis
- Species: A. ascaris

Binomial name
- Aclis ascaris (W. Turton, 1819)

Synonyms
- Alvania albella S. V. Wood, 1842 junior subjective synonym; Alvania ascaris (W. Turton, 1819) superseded combination; Dunkeria inconstans Monterosato, 1890 misspelling; Dunkeria incostans Monterosato, 1890 (name introduced in synonymy); Pyramis acutissimus T. Brown, 1827 junior subjective synonym; Turbo ascaris W. Turton, 1819 superseded combination; Turritella umbilicata Dunker, 1862

= Aclis ascaris =

Species of gastropod

Aclis ascaris is a species of sea snail, a marine gastropod mollusk in the family Eulimidae.

== Description ==
The length of the shell attains 2.3 mm.

== Distribution ==
This species occurs in Mediterranean Sea.

Fossils have been found in Pliocene strata of Belgium and Great Britain (age range: 3.6 to 2.588 Ma)
