= Aclis conula =

Scientific classification
- Kingdom: Animalia
- Phylum: Mollusca
- Class: Gastropoda
- Subclass: Caenogastropoda
- Order: Littorinimorpha
- Superfamily: Vanikoroidea
- Family: Eulimidae
- Genus: Aclis
- Species: A. conula

Binomial name
- Aclis conula Dall, 1927

Species of gastropod

Aclis conula is a species of sea snail, a marine gastropod mollusk in the family Eulimidae.

== Description ==
The length of the shell attains 3.7 mm, its diameter 1.1 mm.

(Original description) The small shell is smooth, white, conical, with a minute blunt apex and about seven moderately convex whorls. The suture is distinct, not deep nor appressed. The sculpture consists only of faint incremental lines, some of which at rare intervals are more pronounced than others. The aperture is short-oval, the margins not thickened, the body without callous deposit. The outer lip is protractively arcuate medially. The inner lip is concavely arcuate with a minute chink behind it. The base of the shell is rather abruptly rounded.

== Distribution ==
This species occurs in the Atlantic Ocean off Fernandina Beach, Florida..
