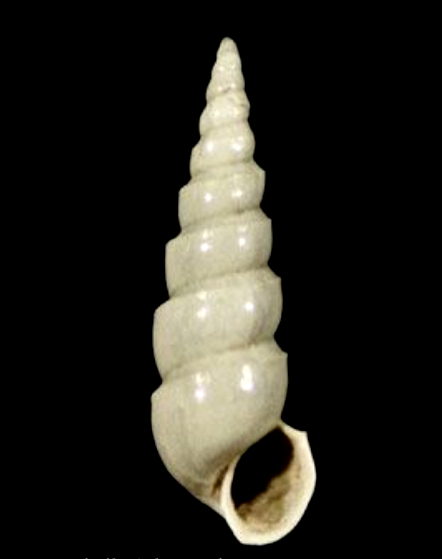
- Shell of Aclis talaverai (holotype at the Natural History Museum, Rotterdam))

Scientific classification
- Kingdom: Animalia
- Phylum: Mollusca
- Class: Gastropoda
- Subclass: Caenogastropoda
- Order: Littorinimorpha
- Superfamily: Vanikoroidea
- Family: Eulimidae
- Genus: Aclis
- Species: A. talaverai

Binomial name
- Aclis talaverai Brunetti & Cresti, 2018

Synonyms
- Aclis scalaris (Talavera, 1975); Eulima scalaris Talavera, 1975 (invalid: junior secondari homonym of Aclis scalaris G. Seguenza, 1876; Aclis talaverai is a replacement name)

= Aclis talaverai =

Species of gastropod

Aclis talaverai is a species of sea snail, a marine gastropod mollusk in the family Eulimidae.

== Distribution ==
This minute marine species occurs off Mauretania.
