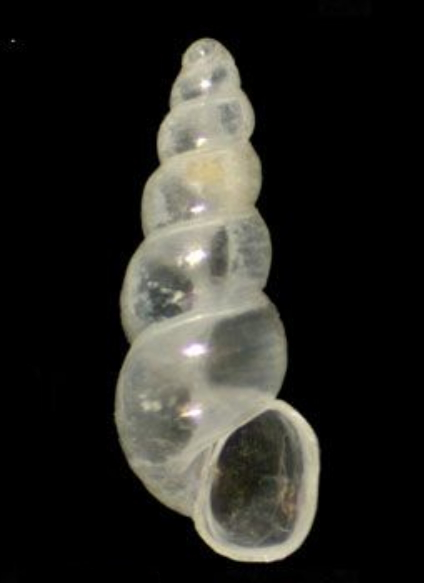
- Shell of Aclis vitrea (specimen at the Natural History Museum, Rotterdam))

Scientific classification
- Kingdom: Animalia
- Phylum: Mollusca
- Class: Gastropoda
- Subclass: Caenogastropoda
- Order: Littorinimorpha
- Superfamily: Vanikoroidea
- Family: Eulimidae
- Genus: Aclis
- Species: A. vitrea

Binomial name
- Aclis vitrea R. B. Watson, 1897

= Aclis vitrea =

Species of gastropod

Aclis vitrea is a species of sea snail, a marine gastropod mollusk in the family Eulimidae.

== Description ==
The length of the shell attains 1.7 mm. The thin shell is hyaline, glossy, tall and narrow. The sculpture has very faint unequal lines of growth. A very feeble spiral angulation is sometimes traceable around the base of the whorl. The colour of the shell is glossy and transparent white.

The spire is high, with very regular narrow outline and a bluntish rounded half-immersed tip. The shell contains 7 whorls. Their curve is a very regular flattened arch. The suture is shallow and oblique. The aperture is full round oval, small. The outer lip is thin, prominent, but toward the body it is drawn back almost into a sinus, somewhat expanding on the base. The inner lip is thin, sharp and patulous. Its connection across the base with the outer lip is long and very filmy. The umbilicus has a small funnel-shaped shallow depression.

== Distribution ==
This minute marine species occurs in the Atlantic Ocean off Madeira.
