= Melanella otagoensis =

Scientific classification
- Kingdom: Animalia
- Phylum: Mollusca
- Class: Gastropoda
- Subclass: Caenogastropoda
- Order: Littorinimorpha
- Superfamily: Vanikoroidea
- Family: Eulimidae
- Genus: Melanella
- Species: M. otagoensis

Binomial name
- Melanella otagoensis (A. W. B. Powell, 1927)

Synonyms
- Eulima otagoensis A. W. B. Powell, 1927 (superseded combination)

Species of gastropod

Melanella otagoensis is a species of sea snail, a marine gastropod mollusk in the family Eulimidae.

== Description ==
The length of the shell attains 2 mm.

== Distribution ==
This marine species is endemic to New Zealand and accors off South-western North Island, southern South Island, and Auckland Islands, at depths between 11 m and 360 m.
