= Melanella paxillus =

- Shell of Melanella paxillus

Scientific classification
- Kingdom: Animalia
- Phylum: Mollusca
- Class: Gastropoda
- Subclass: Caenogastropoda
- Order: Littorinimorpha
- Superfamily: Vanikoroidea
- Family: Eulimidae
- Genus: Melanella
- Species: M. paxillus

Binomial name
- Melanella paxillus (Hedley, 1904)

Synonyms
- Eulima paxillus Hedley, 1904 (superseded combination)

Species of gastropod

Melanella paxillus is a species of sea snail, a marine gastropod mollusk in the family Eulimidae.

== Description ==
The length of the shell attains 2.9 mm; its diameter 0.86 mm.

(Original description) The small shell is short, straight, and subcylindrical with a blunt apex. Thin, colorless, and semitransparent, its surface is smooth and glossy. It comprises six flattened whorls that are impressed at the sutures. Because the shell is translucent, the base of each whorl shows indistinctly through the next, appearing as an impressed line beneath the suture. The aperture is pyriform, the columella is broad, and the right insertion of the peristome sits far back.

== Distribution ==
This marine species is endemic to New Zealand and occurs off Southern South Island, Stewart Island and Auckland Islands at depths between 20 m and 150 m.
