= Hylambates dorsalis =

Hylambates dorsalis is a name given to a frog specimen now in the Berlin's Natural History Museum. It was proposed as the type species of the genus Dendrobatorana, but both taxa are considered as nomina inquirenda, a name that cannot be related to any known species in the wild. Its type locality is "Yoruba (Lagos)"; however, this seems erroneous as the holotype appears to be an Asian member of the family Rhacophoridae. Distribution and ecology of this frog are unknown.
