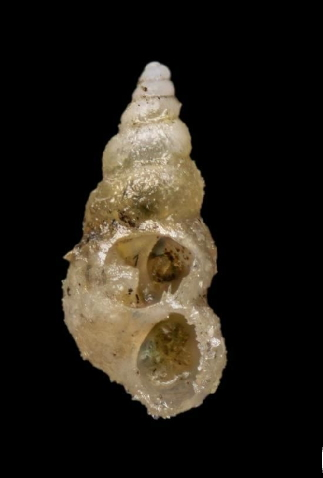
- Shell of Aclis tumens (holotype at the Natural History Museum, London))

Scientific classification
- Kingdom: Animalia
- Phylum: Mollusca
- Class: Gastropoda
- Subclass: Caenogastropoda
- Order: Littorinimorpha
- Superfamily: Vanikoroidea
- Family: Eulimidae
- Genus: Aclis
- Species: A. tumens

Binomial name
- Aclis tumens P. P. Carpenter, 1857

= Aclis tumens =

Species of gastropod

Aclis tumens is a species of sea snail, a marine gastropod mollusk in the family Eulimidae.

== Distribution ==
This minute marine species occurs in the Pacific Ocean off Mexico.
