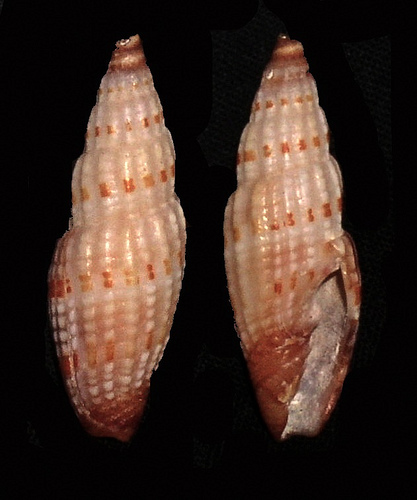
- Shell of Vexillum zikkurat

Scientific classification
- Kingdom: Animalia
- Phylum: Mollusca
- Class: Gastropoda
- Subclass: Caenogastropoda
- Order: Neogastropoda
- Superfamily: Turbinelloidea
- Family: Costellariidae
- Genus: Vexillum
- Species: V. zikkurat

Binomial name
- Vexillum zikkurat H. Turner, 2000

Synonyms
- Vexillum (Costellaria) zikkurat Turner H., 2000

= Vexillum zikkurat =

Species of gastropod

Vexillum zikkurat is a species of sea snail, a marine gastropod mollusk, in the family Costellariidae, the ribbed miters.

This is a taxon inquirendum.

== Distribution ==
This marine species occurs off the Philippines.
