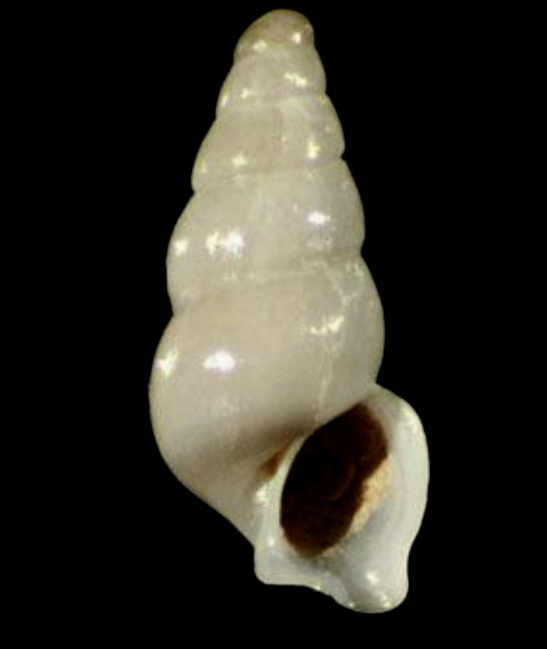
- Shell of Aclis gulsonae (specimen at the Natural History Museum, Rotterdam)

Scientific classification
- Kingdom: Animalia
- Phylum: Mollusca
- Class: Gastropoda
- Subclass: Caenogastropoda
- Order: Littorinimorpha
- Superfamily: Vanikoroidea
- Family: Eulimidae
- Genus: Aclis
- Species: A. gulsonae

Binomial name
- Aclis gulsonae (W. Clark, 1850)

Synonyms
- Aclis gulsonae var. tenuicula Jeffreys, 1867; Chemnitzia gulsonae W. Clark, 1850 (original combination); Pherusina gulsonae (W. Clark, 1850) superseded combination

= Aclis gulsonae =

Species of gastropod

Aclis gulsonae is a species of sea snail, a marine gastropod mollusk in the family Eulimidae.

== Description ==
The shell length ranges from 1.5 mm to 2 mm.

== Distribution ==
This species occurs in the Atlantic Ocean off Shetland and Morocco as well as the Mediterranean Sea.
