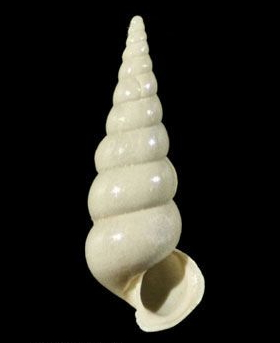
- Shell of Aclis attenuans (specimen at the Natural History Museum, Rotterdam)

Scientific classification
- Kingdom: Animalia
- Phylum: Mollusca
- Class: Gastropoda
- Subclass: Caenogastropoda
- Order: Littorinimorpha
- Superfamily: Vanikoroidea
- Family: Eulimidae
- Genus: Aclis
- Species: A. attenuans

Binomial name
- Aclis attenuans Jeffreys, 1883

Synonyms
- Eulima acutalis Jeffreys, 1883 ·

= Aclis attenuans =

Species of gastropod

Aclis attenuans is a species of sea snail, a marine gastropod mollusk in the family Eulimidae.

== Description ==
The length of the shell varies between 1 mm and 3 mm.

(Original description) The shell forms an elongated cone. It is thin, semitransparent and glossy. There is no sculpture. The colour of the shell is clear white. The spire is gradually tapering to a fine point. It contains 6–7 convex whorls. The body whorl, with the aperture upwards, equals the rest of the shell. The first whorl is globular. The nearly straight suture is well defined but not deep. The aperture is projecting, more round than oval and inclined to squarish, contracted above and effuse or spread out below. The base is entire and not sinuous or notched. The outer lip is sharp-edged and expanding. The inner lip or columella is curved, somewhat reflected and thickened behind, where there is a slight chink but no perforation.

== Distribution ==
This species occurs in Mediterranean Sea and in the Atlantic Ocean off southern Portugal, Morocco and the Canary Islands.
