= Mangelia exstans =

Scientific classification
- Kingdom: Animalia
- Phylum: Mollusca
- Class: Gastropoda
- Subclass: Caenogastropoda
- Order: Neogastropoda
- Superfamily: Conoidea
- Family: Mangeliidae
- Genus: Mangelia
- Species: M. exstans

Binomial name
- Mangelia exstans K. H. Barnard, 1958

Synonyms
- Mangilia exstans K. H. Barnard, 1958

Species of gastropod

Mangelia exstans is a species of sea snail, a marine gastropod mollusk in the family Mangeliidae.

This is a taxon inquirendum.

== Description ==
The shell grows to a length of 2.5 mm, its diameter is 1.3 mm.

== Distribution ==
This marine species is found off East London, South Africa.
