= Aclis pyramida =

Scientific classification
- Kingdom: Animalia
- Phylum: Mollusca
- Class: Gastropoda
- Subclass: Caenogastropoda
- Order: Littorinimorpha
- Superfamily: Vanikoroidea
- Family: Eulimidae
- Genus: Aclis
- Species: A. pyramida

Binomial name
- Aclis pyramida Dall, 1927

Species of gastropod

Aclis pyramida is a species of sea snail, a marine gastropod mollusk in the family Eulimidae.

== Description ==
The length of the shell attains 2 mm, its diameter 1.1 mm.

(Original description) The small shell is short-conic. It is white, smooth and polished. It contains five and a half moderately rounded whorls. The apex is blunt. The suture is well impressed. The body whorl measures about half the length of the shell. The base is evenly rounded and minutely perforate. The aperture is subcircular. The lips are thin, the outer lip prominently arcuate forward.

== Distribution ==
This species occurs in the Atlantic Ocean off Fernandina Beach, Florida.
