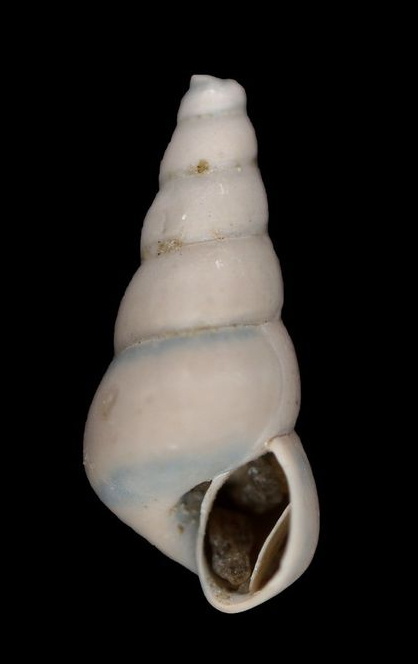
- Shell of Aclis minor (specimen at the Natural History Museum, Rotterdam)

Scientific classification
- Kingdom: Animalia
- Phylum: Mollusca
- Class: Gastropoda
- Subclass: Caenogastropoda
- Order: Littorinimorpha
- Superfamily: Vanikoroidea
- Family: Eulimidae
- Genus: Aclis
- Species: A. minor

Binomial name
- Aclis minor (T. Brown, 1827)

Synonyms
- Aclis supranitida (S. V. Wood, 1842); Alvania supranitida S. V. Wood, 1842; Turritella eburnea Leach, 1852 junior subjective synonym; Turritella minor T. Brown, 1827; Turritella nitida Leach, 1852 junior subjective synonym; Turritella nivea Leach, 1852 junior subjective synonym (Invalid: Junior homonym of...); Turritella suturalis Forbes, 1844

= Aclis minor =

Species of gastropod

Aclis minor is a species of sea snail, a marine gastropod mollusk in the family Eulimidae.

== Description ==
The length of the shell varies between 2.5 mm to 7 mm.

The thin, turriculate shell contains eight whorls.These are convex and spirally ridged. The suture is deep. The upper part of the whorl is naked. The apex is acute. The aperture is oval with a deep umbilicus. The outer lip is curved. The umbilicus is small.

== Distribution ==
This marine species occurs in the Atlantic Ocean off Scandinavia to Madeira; in the North Sea off the Netherlands.
