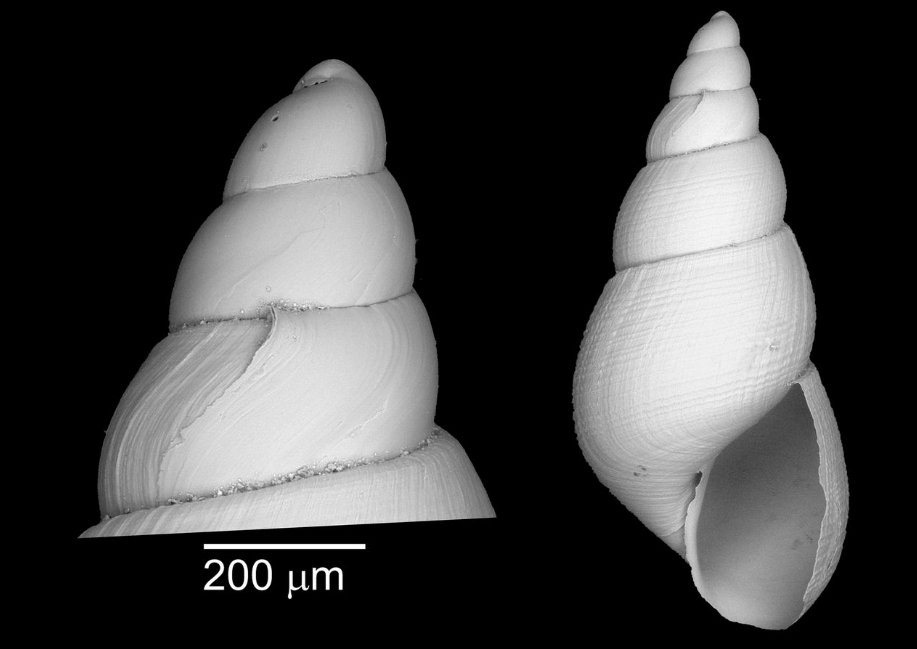
- Shell of Aclis insolita (holotype in the MNHN, Paris)

Scientific classification
- Kingdom: Animalia
- Phylum: Mollusca
- Class: Gastropoda
- Subclass: Caenogastropoda
- Order: Littorinimorpha
- Superfamily: Vanikoroidea
- Family: Eulimidae
- Genus: Aclis
- Species: A. insolita

Binomial name
- Aclis insolita Lozouet, 2015

= Aclis insolita =

Species of gastropod

Aclis insolita is an extinct species of sea snail, a marine gastropod mollusk in the family Eulimidae.

== Distribution ==
Fossils of this species were found in Oligocene strata in Aquitaine France.
