= Ruellia flava =

Ruellia flava may mean:

- Ruellia flava Pers. – an unplaced species
- Ruellia flava Roxb. – a synonym of Strobilanthes flava Kurz
- Ruellia flava Salzm. ex Nees – a synonym of Ruellia ochroleuca Mart. ex Nees
