= Aclis macrostoma =

Scientific classification
- Kingdom: Animalia
- Phylum: Mollusca
- Class: Gastropoda
- Subclass: Caenogastropoda
- Order: Littorinimorpha
- Superfamily: Vanikoroidea
- Family: Eulimidae
- Genus: Aclis
- Species: A. macrostoma

Binomial name
- Aclis macrostoma J. Barros, S. Lima & Francisco, 2007

Species of gastropod

Aclis macrostoma is a species of sea snail, a marine gastropod mollusk in the family Eulimidae.

== Distribution ==
This minute marine species occurs in the Atlantic Ocean off Brazil.
