= Aclis stilifer =

Scientific classification
- Kingdom: Animalia
- Phylum: Mollusca
- Class: Gastropoda
- Subclass: Caenogastropoda
- Order: Littorinimorpha
- Superfamily: Vanikoroidea
- Family: Eulimidae
- Genus: Aclis
- Species: A. stilifer

Binomial name
- Aclis stilifer Dall, 1927

Species of gastropod

Aclis stilifer is a species of sea snail, a marine gastropod mollusk in the family Eulimidae.

== Description ==
The length of the shell attains 2.5 mm, its diameter 1.4 mm.

(Original description) The minute shell is conic. It is white and polished. It has a small blunt apex and about six moderately rounded whorls, of which the earlier ones are more rapidly attenuated. The suture is distinct, appressed, not deep or glazed over. The sculpture consists only of faint flexuous incremental lines. The aperture is rounded-ovate, with a thin margin, a narrow chink behind the inner lip. The base of the shell is briefly rounded.

== Distribution ==
This species occurs in the Atlantic Ocean off Fernandina Beach, Florida and Georgia, USA.
