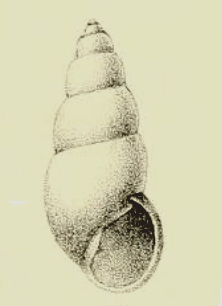
- Shell of Aclis eoa (holotype)

Scientific classification
- Kingdom: Animalia
- Phylum: Mollusca
- Class: Gastropoda
- Subclass: Caenogastropoda
- Order: Littorinimorpha
- Superfamily: Vanikoroidea
- Family: Eulimidae
- Genus: Aclis
- Species: A. eoa

Binomial name
- Aclis eoa Melvill, 1896

= Aclis eoa =

Species of gastropod

Aclis eoa is a species of sea snail, a marine gastropod mollusk in the family Eulimidae.

== Description ==
The length of the shell varies between 3.5 mm and 4 mm, its diameter 1.25 mm.

(Original description) The thin, oblong fusiform shell is semipellucid. It has a milky colour without any gloss. The protoconch is obtuse. The remaining six whorls are a little irregular and distorted. They are ventricose and impressed at the sutures. The aperture is ovate. The outer lip is simple. The columellar margin is somewhat oblique. The peristome is simple.

== Distribution ==
This species occurs in the Arabian Sea off Mumbai, India.
