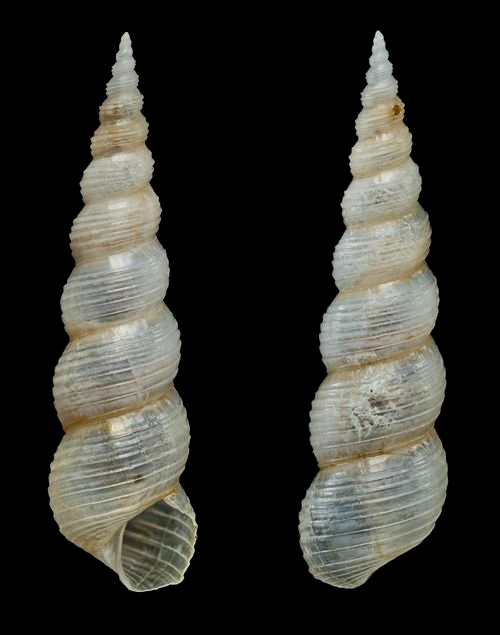
- Shell of Aclis Aclis enilda 001.jpg (specimen at the Natural History Museum, London)

Scientific classification
- Kingdom: Animalia
- Phylum: Mollusca
- Class: Gastropoda
- Subclass: Caenogastropoda
- Order: Littorinimorpha
- Superfamily: Vanikoroidea
- Family: Eulimidae
- Genus: Aclis
- Species: A. enilda

Binomial name
- Aclis enilda Melvill & Standen, 1901

= Aclis enilda =

Species of gastropod

Aclis enilda is a species of sea snail, a marine gastropod mollusk in the family Eulimidae.

== Description ==
The length of the shell attains 8 mm, its diameter 2 mm.

(Original description) A peculiarly refined and exquisite shell with twelve whorls, including three apical smooth and vitreous whorls, the remaining nine being ventricose, much impressed at the sutures. These are uniformly closely spirally lirate, the lirae threaded and subpellucid. The aperture is rounded. The outer lip is thin and effuse. The columella is almost straight.

== Distribution ==
This species occurs in the Gulf of Oman and off the Philippines.
