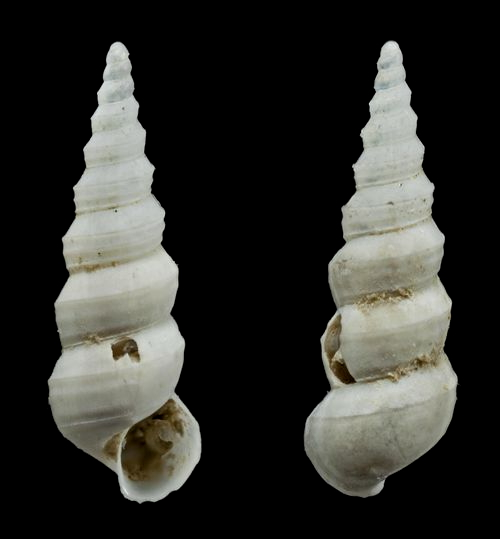
- Shell of Aclis calotropis (specimen at the Natural History Museum, London)

Scientific classification
- Kingdom: Animalia
- Phylum: Mollusca
- Class: Gastropoda
- Subclass: Caenogastropoda
- Order: Littorinimorpha
- Superfamily: Vanikoroidea
- Family: Eulimidae
- Genus: Aclis
- Species: A. calotropis

Binomial name
- Aclis calotropis Melvill & Standen, 1901

= Aclis calotropis =

Species of gastropod

Aclis calotropis is a species of sea snail, a marine gastropod mollusk in the family Eulimidae.

== Description ==
The length of the shell attains 3 mm, its diameter 1 mm.

(Original description) This very delicate species is vitreous, 10-whorled, delicately spirally lirate. The lirae are distant, few, and conspicuously once acutely keeled at the centre of each whorl. The body whorl is slightly prolonged. The aperture is ovate. The outer lip is thin. The columella is produced, causing a slight angular projection at the base of the lip.

== Distribution ==
This species occurs in the Gulf of Oman.
