= Aclis eolis =

Scientific classification
- Kingdom: Animalia
- Phylum: Mollusca
- Class: Gastropoda
- Subclass: Caenogastropoda
- Order: Littorinimorpha
- Superfamily: Vanikoroidea
- Family: Eulimidae
- Genus: Aclis
- Species: A. eolis

Binomial name
- Aclis eolis Bartsch, 1947

Species of gastropod

Aclis eolis is a species of sea snail, a marine gastropod mollusk in the family Eulimidae.

== Description ==
The length of the shell attains 4 mm, its diameter 1.4 mm.

== Distribution ==
This minute marine species occurs off Florida, USA.
