= Aclis shepardiana =

Scientific classification
- Kingdom: Animalia
- Phylum: Mollusca
- Class: Gastropoda
- Subclass: Caenogastropoda
- Order: Littorinimorpha
- Superfamily: Vanikoroidea
- Family: Eulimidae
- Genus: Aclis
- Species: A. shepardiana

Binomial name
- Aclis shepardiana (Dall, 1919)

Synonyms
- Graphis shepardiana Dall, 1919 (original combination)

Species of gastropod

Aclis shepardiana is a species of sea snail, a marine gastropod mollusk in the family Eulimidae.

== Description ==
The length of the shell attains 3.7 mm, its diameter 1 mm.

(Original description) The mute, slender shell is translucent yellowish. It has about nine whorls, including the rather blunt smooth apical protoconch. The suture is constricted and distinct. The whorls of the spire are rather lax. The axial sculpture consists of minute, close-set plications which start from the suture and become feeble on the base. These are crossed by minute close spiral striae most evident near the periphery, and under the lens showing an inconspicuous reticulation. The base is imperforate, rounded, and somewhat produced. The aperture is ovate. The outer lip is thin, not reflected, interrupted by the body and produced anteriorly.

== Distribution ==
This species occurs in the Pacific Ocean off California.
