= Aclis gittenbergeri =

Scientific classification
- Kingdom: Animalia
- Phylum: Mollusca
- Class: Gastropoda
- Subclass: Caenogastropoda
- Order: Littorinimorpha
- Superfamily: Vanikoroidea
- Family: Eulimidae
- Genus: Aclis
- Species: A. gittenbergeri

Binomial name
- Aclis gittenbergeri (De Jong & Coomans, 1988)

Synonyms
- Bermudaclis gittenbergeri De Jong & Coomans, 1988 (original combination); Murchisonella gittenbergeri (De Jong & Coomans, 1988)

Species of gastropod

Aclis gittenbergeri is a species of sea snail, a marine gastropod mollusk in the family Eulimidae.

== Description ==
The length of the shell attains 1.8 mm, its diameter is 0.6 mm.

== Distribution ==
This minute marine species occurs in the Caribbean Sea off Aruba.
