= Umbilibalcis =

Scientific classification
- Kingdom: Animalia
- Phylum: Mollusca
- Class: Gastropoda
- Subclass: Caenogastropoda
- Order: Littorinimorpha
- Family: Eulimidae
- Genus: Umbilibalcis; Bouchet & Warén, 1986

Type species
- Aclis lata Dall, 1889

Genus of gastropods

Umbilibalcis is a genus of very small ectoparasitic sea snails, marine gastropod mollusks or micromollusks in the Eulimidae family.

== Species ==
Species within the genus Umbilibalcisinclude :

- Umbilibalcis crassula Bouchet & Warén, 1986
- Umbilibalcis lata (Dall, 1889)
- Umbilibalcis subumbilicata (Jeffreys, 1884)
