= Hemiaclis katrinae =

Scientific classification
- Kingdom: Animalia
- Phylum: Mollusca
- Class: Gastropoda
- Subclass: Caenogastropoda
- Order: Littorinimorpha
- Family: Eulimidae
- Genus: Hemiaclis
- Species: H. katrinae

Binomial name
- Hemiaclis katrinae Engl, 2006

Species of gastropod

Hemiaclis katrinae is a species of sea snail, a marine gastropod mollusk in the family Eulimidae.
