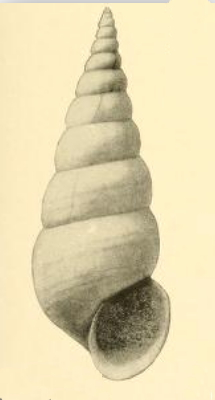
- Shell of Aclis tenuis

Scientific classification
- Kingdom: Animalia
- Phylum: Mollusca
- Class: Gastropoda
- Subclass: Caenogastropoda
- Order: Littorinimorpha
- Superfamily: Vanikoroidea
- Family: Eulimidae
- Genus: Aclis
- Species: A. tenuis

Binomial name
- Aclis tenuis A. E. Verrill, 1882

Synonyms
- Aclis fernandinae Dall, 1927; Aclis tanneri (Bartsch, 1947) ·; Aclis verrilli Bartsch, 1911; Hemiaclis fernandinae (Dall, 1927); Hemiaclis tanneri Bartsch, 1947

= Aclis tenuis =

Species of gastropod

Aclis tenuis is a species of sea snail, a marine gastropod mollusk in the family Eulimidae.

== Distribution ==
This species occurs in the Northwest Atlantic Ocean off the Gulf of Maine and the Gulf of St. Lawrence.

== Description ==
The maximum recorded shell length is 4.6 mm.

(Described as Aclis verrilli) The acicular shell is yellowish-white. The four whorls of the protoconch are well-rounded, with strongly impressed sutures, smooth, forming a slender apex to the spire. The post-nuclear whorls are well-rounded and appressed at the summit. They are sculptured by six feeble, poorly defined, somewhat irregular spiral threads and numerous incremental lines, the combination of the two lending the surface of the spire a feebly malleated surface. In addition to the above sculpture the surface is marked with irregularly disposed varical lines. The sutures are strongly impressed. The periphery of the body whorl is well rounded. The base is moderately long, well rounded, narrowly umbilicated and marked by seven feeble and irregularly placed spiral lines. Its surface has the same aspect as that of the spire. The aperture is rather large, somewhat effuse anteriorly, posterior angle somewhat obtuse. The outer lip is patulous. The columella is oblique, slightly curved and strongly revolute.

== Habitat ==
Minimum recorded depth is 91 m. Maximum recorded depth is 3235 m.
