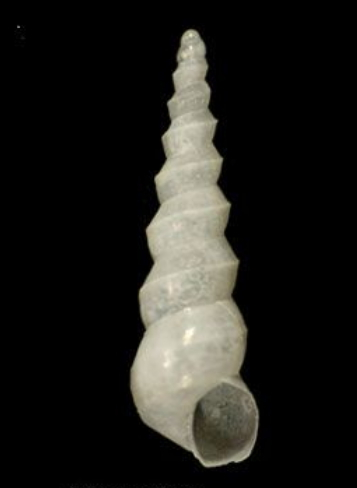
- Shell of Aclis angulifera (specimen at the Natural History Museum, Rotterdam)

Scientific classification
- Kingdom: Animalia
- Phylum: Mollusca
- Class: Gastropoda
- Subclass: Caenogastropoda
- Order: Littorinimorpha
- Family: Eulimidae
- Genus: Aclis
- Species: A. angulifera

Binomial name
- Aclis angulifera (Yokoyama, 1922)

Synonyms
- Turbonilla angulifera Yokoyama, 1922

= Aclis angulifera =

Species of gastropod

Aclis angulifera is a species of sea snail, a marine gastropod mollusk in the family Eulimidae.

== Description ==
The length of the shell attains 6 mm, its diameter 1.8 mm.

(Original description) The small shell is elongate-conic. It contains about ten whorls, of which 1 1/2 smooth whorls in the protoconch. The other whorls are angulate in the middle, the angle becoming gradually obtuse as the whorls grow, on the penultimate and the ultimate whorls almost obsolete, so that look quite convex. The shell is spirally striate. There about ten striae. These are close and only separated by fine, impressed lines. The periphery is angulate. The base is flatly convex and smooth. The aperture is subquadrate. The inner lip is bent at an angle a little greater than a right angle. The outer lip is thin.

== Distribution ==
This species occurs off Japan, Korea, Indonesia and off the Philippines.
