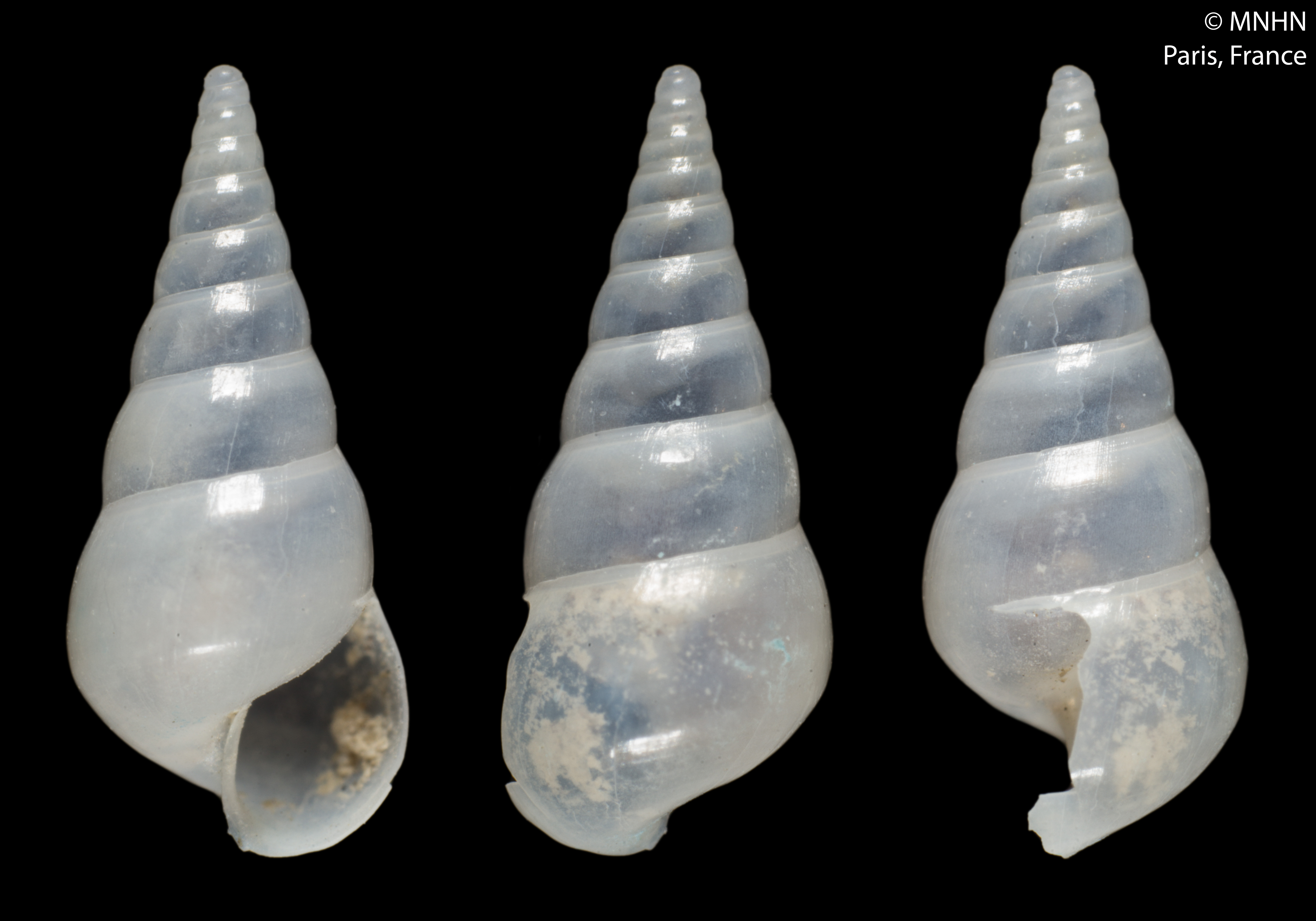
- Shell of Hemiaclis obtusa (holotype at MNHN, Paris)

Scientific classification
- Kingdom: Animalia
- Phylum: Mollusca
- Class: Gastropoda
- Subclass: Caenogastropoda
- Order: Littorinimorpha
- Family: Eulimidae
- Genus: Hemiaclis
- Species: H. obtusa

Binomial name
- Hemiaclis obtusa Bouchet & Warén, 1986

Synonyms
- Hemiaclis obtusus Bouchet & Warén, 1986

= Hemiaclis obtusa =

Species of gastropod

Hemiaclis obtusa is a species of sea snail, a marine gastropod mollusk in the family Eulimidae.

== Description ==
The length of the shell measures approximately 5.5 mm in length and can be located at depths of roughly 1500 m below sea level.

== Distribution ==
This species occurs in the following locations:

- European waters (ERMS scope)
- United Kingdom Exclusive Economic Zone
