= Melanella limata =

- Shell of Melanella limata (specimen at the Natural History Museum, London)

Scientific classification
- Kingdom: Animalia
- Phylum: Mollusca
- Class: Gastropoda
- Subclass: Caenogastropoda
- Order: Littorinimorpha
- Superfamily: Vanikoroidea
- Family: Eulimidae
- Genus: Melanella
- Species: M. limata

Binomial name
- Melanella limata (Dall, 1927)

Synonyms
- Aclis limata Dall, 1927 superseded combination

Species of gastropod

Melanella limata is a species of sea snail, a marine gastropod mollusk in the family Eulimidae.

== Description ==
The length of the shell attains 4 mm, its diameter 1.5 mm.

(Original description) The small, thin shell is acute-conic. It is translucent white, polished, with a minute blunt apex and about seven whorls. The suture is distinct, closely appressed and not glazed over. Later whorls are slightly overhanging the succeeding suture. The sculpture of the shell consists of very fine close flexuous incremental lines only visible under magnification. The base is evenly rounded and is imperforate. The aperture is ovate. The thin outer lip is produced medially, rounding into the arcuate inner lip.

== Distribution ==
This species occurs in the Atlantic Ocean off Fernandina Beach, Florida; also off Japan.
