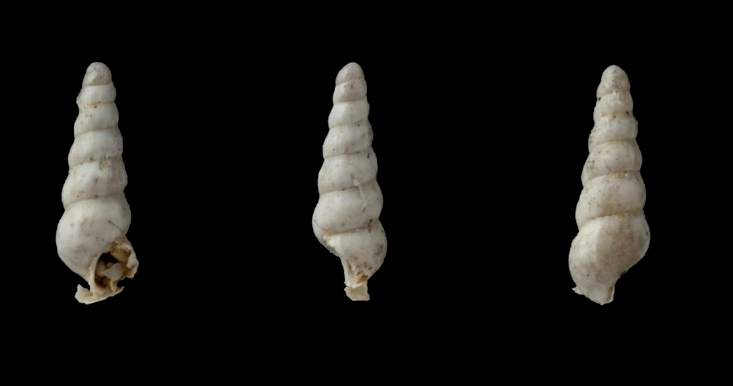
- Shell of Aclis sarissa (specimen at the Natural History Museum, London)

Scientific classification
- Kingdom: Animalia
- Phylum: Mollusca
- Class: Gastropoda
- Subclass: Caenogastropoda
- Order: Littorinimorpha
- Superfamily: Vanikoroidea
- Family: Eulimidae
- Genus: Aclis
- Species: A. sarissa

Binomial name
- Aclis sarissa R. B. Watson, 1881

Synonyms
- Aclis dalli Bartsch, 1911; Hemiaclis dalli (Bartsch, 1911) ·

= Aclis sarissa =

Species of gastropod

Aclis sarissa is a species of sea snail, a marine gastropod mollusk in the family Eulimidae.

== Description ==
The length of the shell varies between 4 mm and 8 mm.

(Original description) The smooth, subulate shell is conical. it is smooth, white and glossy. It shows rounded whorls and a somewhat impressed suture.

Sculpture. Longitudinals—there are a few very minute and faint lines of growth.

Spirals—there are a few irregular and very slight transverse angulations, which are connected with a very subdued and almost invisible malleated surface, which may be seen in a changing light.

The colour is white, probably transparent in fresh specimens. The surface, which is glassy, is very smooth.

The spire is conical, but not quite regularly so, being slightly convex in the middle and very faintly concave above and below. The apex, for the genus and relatively to size, is blunt, almost slightly tumid, round, but with the faintest conceivable prominence on one side of the extreme tip. The shell contains 9 whorls, of regular increase, though the last is a little disproportionally large, well rounded. The body whorl, which is slightly tumid, has a very faint trace of angulation below the suture and at the edge of the base, which is flatly rounded and projecting, with a slightly thickened and angulated carination round the umbilicus. The suture is linear, impressed, and very slightly oblique. The aperture is oval, bluntly angulated above, effuse on the base and slightly so on the outer lip. The outer lip is slightly pinched in at its union with the body. From this point it runs out to the right with a free curve, but, speedily turning to the left, its course is straight, and here it is prominent, and it becomes increasingly patulous as it curves quickly round to join the columella. The columella is not at all oblique, but is slightly concave. The inner lip crosses the body on a thin but sharply-edged pad. It is thin, sharp, and scarcely patulous on the front of the columella. The umbilicus is formed by a small funnel-shaped trough between the columellar lip and the angulated edge of the base, but this contracts immediately to a mere chink.

== Distribution ==
This marine species occurs in the Atlantic Ocean off Brazil; also in the Caribbean Sea off Cuba.
