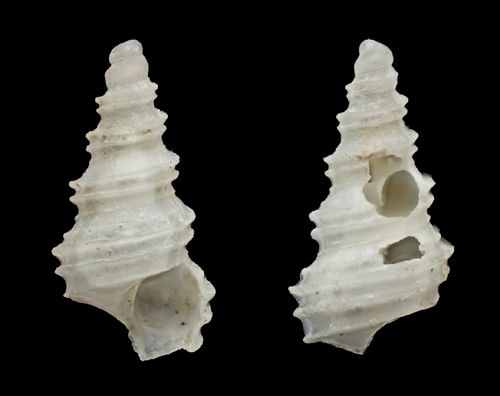
- Shell of Aclis maoria (specimen at the Natural History Museum, London)

Scientific classification
- Kingdom: Animalia
- Phylum: Mollusca
- Class: Gastropoda
- Subclass: Caenogastropoda
- Order: Littorinimorpha
- Family: Eulimidae
- Genus: Aclis
- Species: A. maoria

Binomial name
- Aclis maoria A. W. B. Powell, 1937

= Aclis maoria =

Species of gastropod

Aclis maoria is a species of sea snail, a marine gastropod mollusk in the family Eulimidae.

== Description ==
The length of the shell attains 3.4 mm, its diameter 1.6 mm.

(Original description) The very small shell is turreted, elongate, and white. it is sculptured with sharp spiral keels. There are seven and a half whorls, which include a globular, smooth protoconch of two whorls. The spire is about three times the height of the aperture. The spire whorls feature two prominent keels, which increase to three by the penultimate whorl. There is a fairly prominent supra-sutural spiral as well, and this almost equals the strength of the keels on the body whorl. The base is smooth, almost flat, and is separated from a deep, crescentic umbilical cavity by a sharp ridge. The aperture is quadrate, while the peristome is discontinuous. The outer lip is thin and sharp, and the columella is arcuate, reflecting slightly over the umbilicus.

== Distribution ==
This marine species in endemic to New Zealand and occurs off the Three Kings Islands.
