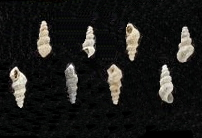
- Shell of Aclis angulata (specimen at the Natural History Museum, London)

Scientific classification
- Kingdom: Animalia
- Phylum: Mollusca
- Class: Gastropoda
- Subclass: Caenogastropoda
- Order: Littorinimorpha
- Family: Eulimidae
- Genus: Aclis
- Species: A. angulata

Binomial name
- Aclis angulata E. A. Smith, 1890

= Aclis angulata =

Species of gastropod

Aclis angulata is a species of sea snail, a marine gastropod mollusk in the family Eulimidae.

== Homonymy ==
Junior homonym of Aclis angulata P. Fischer, 1869.

== Description ==
The length of the shell attains 2 mm (0.079 in), and its diameter is 0.75 mm (0.030 in).

The shell is small, elongate, and turreted, with a smooth white surface and composed of six whorls. The first two whorls are large, convex, and smooth, transitioning to subsequent whorls that are obliquely sloping above, sharply carinate-angular at the midsection, and constricted below the angle. These later whorls are adorned with prominently elevated, closely spaced, and regular growth lines.

The body whorl exhibits a very obtusely rounded-angular profile at the periphery. The aperture is oblique and irregularly ovate, with a continuous, non-thickened peristome that is subtly sinuate above the angle near the suture.

This little species is remarkable for its angular whorls, the regular close-set raised lines of growth, and large apex.

== Distribution ==
This species has occurred in the Atlantic Ocean off Saint Helena.
