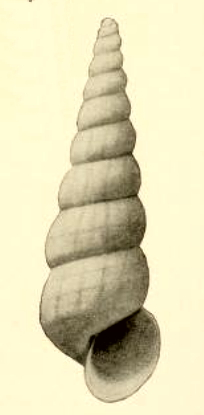
- Shell of Hemiaclis carolinensis (holotype)

Scientific classification
- Kingdom: Animalia
- Phylum: Mollusca
- Class: Gastropoda
- Subclass: Caenogastropoda
- Order: Littorinimorpha
- Superfamily: Vanikoroidea
- Family: Eulimidae
- Genus: Hemiaclis
- Species: H. carolinensis

Binomial name
- Hemiaclis carolinensis Bartsch, 1911

Synonyms
- Aclis carolinensis Bartsch, 1911

= Hemiaclis carolinensis =

Species of gastropod

Hemiaclis carolinensis is a species of sea snail, a marine gastropod mollusk in the family Eulimidae.

== Description ==
The length of the shell attains 4.7 mm, its diameter 1.3 mm.

(Original description) The shell is acicular. The two whorls in the protoconch are well rounded and smooth. The early post-nuclear whorls are gently rounded on the posterior two-thirds between the sutures and abruptly on the anterior one-third. The later are more evenly rounded. The shell is sculptured with numerous fine incremental lines and by feeble, somewhat irregular, raised, slender spiral threads. The combination of the incremental lines and the spiral threads lends the surface of the whorls a somewhat malleated appearance. In addition to the above sculpture, varical lines appear at irregular intervals. The sutures are strongly impressed. The periphery of the body whorl is obliquely angled. The base of the shell is moderately long, strongly but narrowly umbilicated, well-rounded and sculptured like the spire with spiral striation, incremental lines and about six obsolete raised spiral threads. The aperture is large, decidedly effuse anteriorly, the basal portion patulous. The posterior angle is obtuse. The outer lip is thin. The columella is strongly curved, expanded and revolute.

== Distribution ==
This species occurs in the following locations:

- North West Atlantic; the holotype was found off Cape Hatteras, North Carolina, USA.
