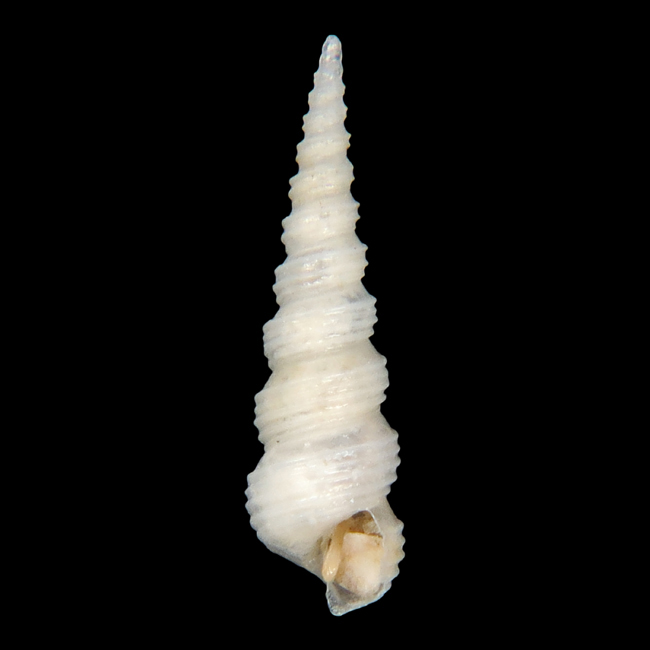

Scientific classification
- Kingdom: Animalia
- Phylum: Mollusca
- Class: Gastropoda
- Subclass: Caenogastropoda
- Order: Littorinimorpha
- Family: Eulimidae
- Genus: Aclis
- Species: A. maestratii

Binomial name
- Aclis maestratii Poppe & Tagaro, 2016

= Aclis maestratii =

Species of gastropod

Aclis maestratii is a species of sea snail, a marine gastropod mollusk in the family Eulimidae.

== Description ==
The length of the shell attains 5 mm.

== Distribution ==
This marine species occurs off the Philippines.
