= Aclis marguerita =

Scientific classification
- Kingdom: Animalia
- Phylum: Mollusca
- Class: Gastropoda
- Subclass: Caenogastropoda
- Order: Littorinimorpha
- Superfamily: Vanikoroidea
- Family: Eulimidae
- Genus: Aclis
- Species: A. marguerita

Binomial name
- Aclis marguerita (Bartsch, 1947)

Synonyms
- Hemiaclis marguerita Bartsch, 1947

Species of gastropod

Aclis marguerita is a species of sea snail, a marine gastropod mollusk in the family Eulimidae.

== Description ==
The length of the shell attains 9.5 mm, its diameter 2 mm. The shell is elongate-turreted and white.

== Distribution ==
This minute marine species occurs in the Atlantic Ocean off Fernandina, Florida and Georgia, USA.
