= Hemiaclis incolorata =

Scientific classification
- Kingdom: Animalia
- Phylum: Mollusca
- Class: Gastropoda
- Subclass: Caenogastropoda
- Order: Littorinimorpha
- Family: Eulimidae
- Genus: Hemiaclis
- Species: H. incolorata

Binomial name
- Hemiaclis incolorata Thiele, 1912

Species of gastropod

Hemiaclis incolorata is a species of sea snail, a marine gastropod mollusk in the family Eulimidae.

== Description ==
The maximum recorded shell length is 6.5 mm.

== Habitat ==
Minimum recorded depth is 300 m. Maximum recorded depth is 1437 m.
