= Hemiaclis ventrosa =

Scientific classification
- Kingdom: Animalia
- Phylum: Mollusca
- Class: Gastropoda
- Subclass: Caenogastropoda
- Order: Littorinimorpha
- Family: Eulimidae
- Genus: Hemiaclis
- Species: H. ventrosa

Binomial name
- Hemiaclis ventrosa Friele, 1874

Synonyms
- Aclis ventrosa Friele, 1874; Hemiaclis glabra G.O. Sars, 1878; Hemiaclis ventrosus Friele, 1874

Species of gastropod

Hemiaclis ventrosa is a species of sea snail, a marine gastropod mollusk in the family Eulimidae.

== Distribution ==
This species occurs in the following locations:

- European waters (ERMS scope)
- United Kingdom Exclusive Economic Zone

== Description ==
The maximum recorded shell length is 4 mm.

== Habitat ==
Minimum recorded depth is 1900 m. Maximum recorded depth is 1900 m.
