= Hemiaclis georgiana =

Scientific classification
- Kingdom: Animalia
- Phylum: Mollusca
- Class: Gastropoda
- Subclass: Caenogastropoda
- Order: Littorinimorpha
- Family: Eulimidae
- Genus: Hemiaclis
- Species: H. georgiana

Binomial name
- Hemiaclis georgiana Dall, 1927

Synonyms
- Aclis georgiana Dall, 1927

Species of gastropod

Hemiaclis georgiana is a species of sea snail, a marine gastropod mollusk in the family Eulimidae.
