= Drillia tholos =

Scientific classification
- Kingdom: Animalia
- Phylum: Mollusca
- Class: Gastropoda
- Subclass: Caenogastropoda
- Order: Neogastropoda
- Superfamily: Conoidea
- Family: Drilliidae
- Genus: Drillia
- Species: D. tholos

Binomial name
- Drillia tholos Barnard, 1958

Species of gastropod

Drillia tholos is a species of sea snail, a marine gastropod mollusk in the family Drilliidae.

== Description ==
Dead Drillia tholos often form shallow marine sediments. The shells attain lengths of 5 mm, with a diameter of 2 mm, dextrally coiled. It is a rare species and only found in certain regions across the globe.

== Distribution ==
This species occurs in the demersal zone off East London, South Africa.
