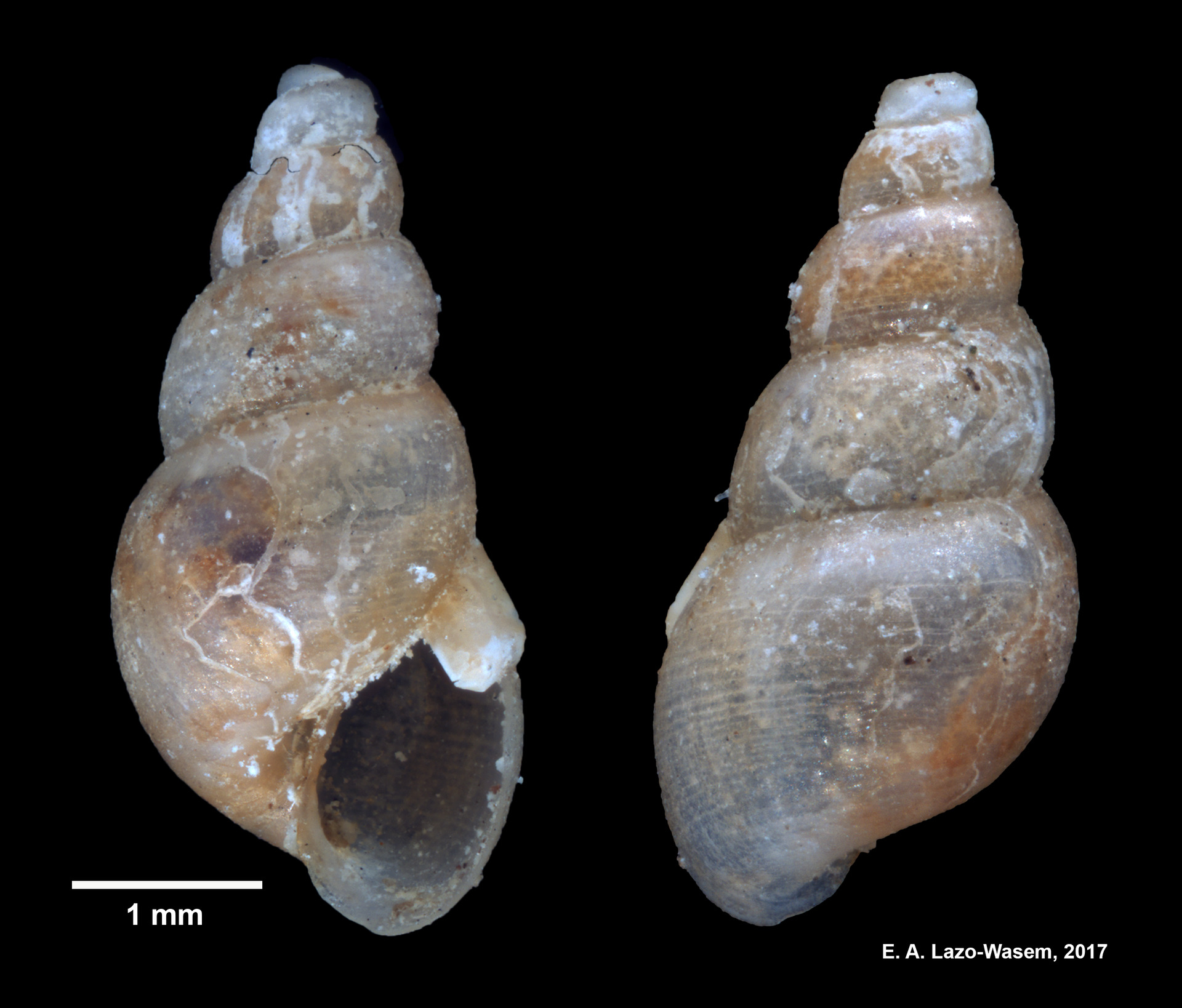

Scientific classification
- Kingdom: Animalia
- Phylum: Mollusca
- Class: Gastropoda
- Family: Pyramidellidae
- Genus: Odostomia
- Species: O. striata

Binomial name
- Odostomia striata (A. E. Verrill, 1880)

Synonyms
- Aclis striata A. E. Verrill, 1880

= Odostomia striata =

Species of gastropod

Odostomia striata is a species of sea snail, a marine gastropod mollusc in the family Pyramidellidae, the pyrams and their allies.

== Distribution ==
This species occurs in the following locations:

- Atlantic
- Cobscook Bay
- Gulf of Maine
- North West Atlantic
- USA
