= Umbilibalcis lata =

Scientific classification
- Kingdom: Animalia
- Phylum: Mollusca
- Class: Gastropoda
- Subclass: Caenogastropoda
- Order: Littorinimorpha
- Family: Eulimidae
- Genus: Umbilibalcis
- Species: U. lata

Binomial name
- Umbilibalcis lata (Dall, 1889)

Synonyms
- Aclis lata Dall, 1889 (original combination); Aclis supranitida var. lata Dall, 1889; Umbilibalcis lata Dall, 1889; Mucronalia capillastericola Minichev, 1970

Species of gastropod

Umbilibalcis lata is a species of sea snail, a marine gastropod mollusk in the family Eulimidae.

== Description ==
The maximum recorded shell length is 5.5 mm.

== Habitat ==
Minimum recorded depth is 183 m. Maximum recorded depth is 183 m.
