= Species inquirenda =

Species of dubious identity

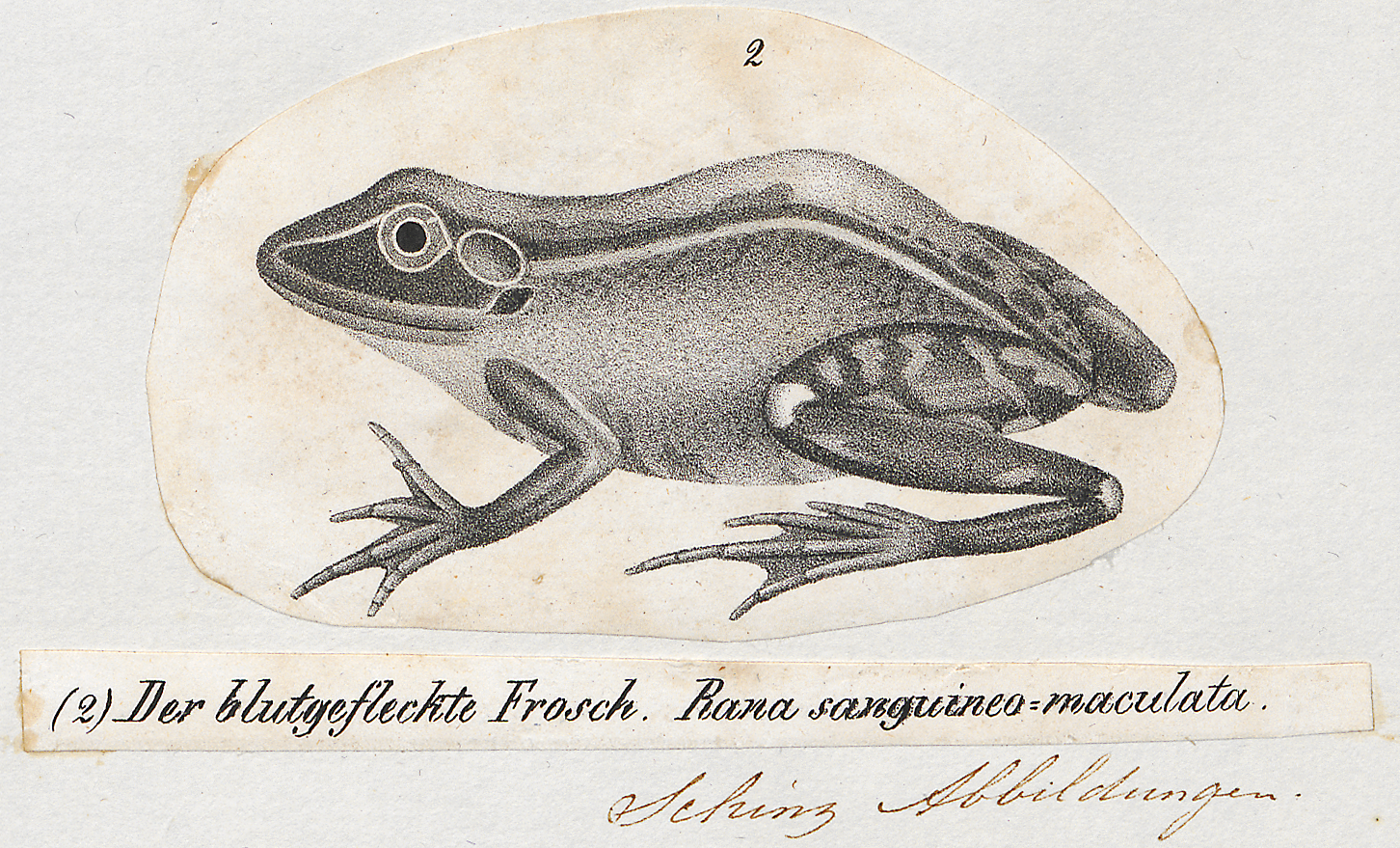
Rana sanguineo-maculata is considered a species inquirenda

A species inquirenda is a species of doubtful identity requiring further investigation. The use of the term in English-language biological literature dates back to at least the early nineteenth century.

The term taxon inquirendum is broader in meaning and refers to an incompletely defined taxon of which the taxonomic validity is uncertain or disputed by different experts or is impossible to identify the taxon. Further characterization is required.

Certain species names may be designated unplaced names, which Plants of the World Online defines as "names that cannot be accepted, nor can they be put into synonymy". Unplaced names may be names which were not validly published, later homonyms which are therefore illegitimate, or species which cannot be accepted because the genus name is not accepted. Species names may remain unplaced if there is no accepted species in a genus in which it can be placed, or if the type material for the species is not known to exist, is insufficient to establish a clear identity, or has not been studied by experts in the group in order to properly place it.

Nomenclatural instability refers to the phenomenon where there is disagreement or lack of consensus regarding the naming of a species, which can lead to multiple proposed names for the same species. Synonymy: when different names are proposed for the same species, they become synonyms, which can complicate classification and identification.

== See also ==
- Glossary of scientific naming
- Candidatus, a proposed taxon based on incomplete evidence
- incertae sedis, a taxon of uncertain position in a classification
- nomen dubium, a name of unknown or doubtful application
- Open nomenclature, a system of notations used in taxonomy to indicate a taxonomist's judgement about taxon affinities
