= Vanikoroidea =

Scientific classification
- Kingdom: Animalia
- Phylum: Mollusca
- Class: Gastropoda
- Subclass: Caenogastropoda
- Order: Littorinimorpha
- Superfamily: Vanikoroidea; Gray, 1840

Families
- See text

Synonyms
- Eulimoidea R. A. Philippi, 1853; Hipponicoidea J. E. Gray, 1840

Superfamily of gastropods

Vanikoroidea is a superfamily of sea snails, marine gastropod molluscs in the order Littorinimorpha. The superfamily Eulimoidea is a synonym of Vanikoroidea.

== Families ==
Families within the superfamily Vanikoroidea include:

- Eulimidae Philippi, 1853
- † Gigantocapulidae Beu, 2007
- Vanikoridae Gray, 1840

Synonyms

- Aclididae G. O. Sars, 1878 : synonym of Eulimidae R. A. Philippi, 1853
- Asterophilidae Thiele, 1925 : synonym of Eulimidae R. A. Philippi, 1853
- Enteroxenidae Schwanwitsch, 1917 : synonym of Eulimidae R. A. Philippi, 1853
- Entocolacidae Voigt, 1888 : synonym of Eulimidae R. A. Philippi, 1853
- Melanellidae Iredale, 1915 : synonym of Eulimidae R. A. Philippi, 1853
- Pelseneeriidae Schwanwitsch, 1917 : synonym of Eulimidae R. A. Philippi, 1853
- Pherusidae Locard, 1886 : synonym of Aclididae G. O. Sars, 1878 : synonym of Eulimidae R. A. Philippi, 1853 (type genus a junior homonym of Pherusa Oken, 1807, and several others)
- Roseniidae Nierstrasz, 1913 : synonym of Eulimidae R. A. Philippi, 1853
- Strombiformidae Iredale, 1915 : synonym of Eulimidae R. A. Philippi, 1853
- Stylinidae R. A. Philippi, 1853 : synonym of Eulimidae R. A. Philippi, 1853 (Invalid: type genus [Stylina Fleming, 1828] a junior homonym)
- Thycidae Thiele, 1929 : synonym of Eulimidae R. A. Philippi, 1853
- Turtoniidae Rosén, 1910 : synonym of Eulimidae R. A. Philippi, 1853 (type genus [Turtonia Rosén, 1910] a junior homonym)
