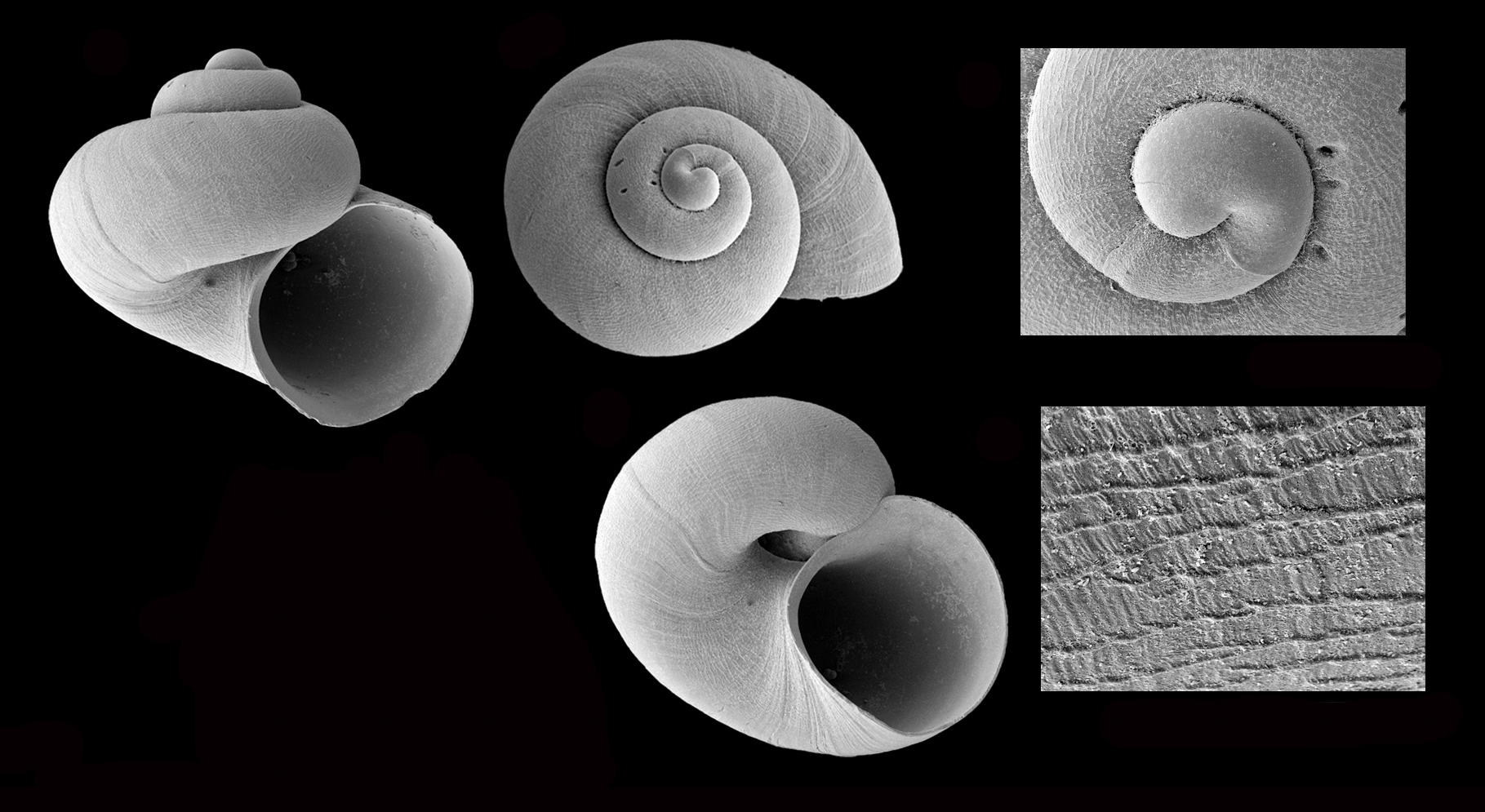
- Shell of Anekes mikrosculpta (holotype at MNHN, Paris)

Scientific classification
- Kingdom: Animalia
- Phylum: Mollusca
- Class: Gastropoda
- Subclass: Vetigastropoda
- Superfamily: Seguenzioidea
- Genus: Anekes; Bouchet & Waren, 1979

Type species
- Anekes undulisculpta Bouchet, Ph. & A. Warén, 1979

Species
- See text

= Anekes =

Genus of gastropods

Anekes is a genus of sea snails, marine gastropod mollusks, unassigned in the superfamily Seguenzioidea.

== Species ==
Species within the genus Anekes include:

- Anekes affinis (Jeffreys, 1883)
- Anekes anderswareni Hoffman, Gofas & Freiwald, 2020
- Anekes mikrosculpta Hoffman, Gofas & Freiwald, 2020
- Anekes paucistriata Warén, 1992
- Anekes sculpturata Warén, 1992
- Anekes spiralis Serge GOFAS, Ángel A. LUQUE, Joan Daniel OLIVER, José TEMPLADO & Alberto SERRA, 2021
- Anekes umbilisculpta Hoffman, Gofas & Freiwald, 2020
- Anekes undulisculpta Bouchet & Warén, 1979
- Anekes varisculpta Hoffman, Gofas & Freiwald, 2020

Species brought into synonymy

- Anekes gittenbergeri van Aartsen & Bogi, 1988: synonym of Lissotesta gittenbergeri (van Aartsen & Bogi, 1988)
- Anekes giustii Bogi & Nofroni, 1989: synonym of Mikro giustii (Bogi & Nofroni, 1989)
- Anekes inflata Warén, 1992: synonym of Granigyra inflata (Warén, 1992)
- Anekes nofronii van Aartsen & Bogi, 1988: synonym of Lissotesta turrita (Gaglini, 1987)
- Anekes sabellii Bogi & Nofroni 1989: synonym of Lissomphalia bithynoides (Monterosato, 1880)
- Anekes undulispira [sic] : synonym of Anekes undulisculpta Bouchet & Warén, 1979 (misspelling)
