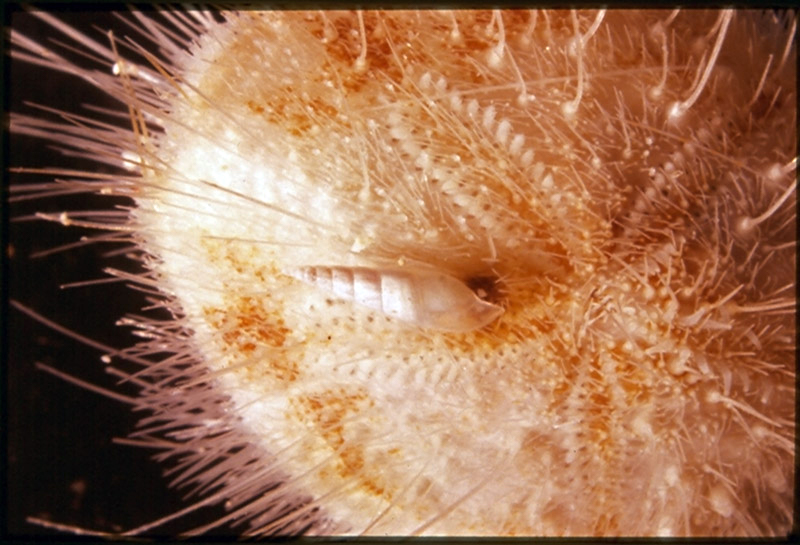
- Hypermastus mareticola on the aboral surface of Maretia planulata

Scientific classification
- Kingdom: Animalia
- Phylum: Mollusca
- Class: Gastropoda
- Subclass: Caenogastropoda
- Order: Littorinimorpha
- Family: Eulimidae
- Genus: Hypermastus; Pilsbry, 1899

Type species
- Eulima coxi Pilsbry, 1899

Synonyms
- Eulima (Hypermastus) Pilsbry, 1899

= Hypermastus =

Genus of gastropods

Hypermastus is a genus of sea snails, marine gastropod mollusks in the family Eulimidae.

== Species ==
Species within this genus include the following:

- Hypermastus acutus (G. B. Sowerby I, 1834)
- Hypermastus araeosomae (Habe, 1992)
- Hypermastus auritae (Warén, 1991)
- Hypermastus boschorum (Warén, 1991)
- Hypermastus bulbulus (Murdoch & Suter, 1906)
- Hypermastus casta (A. Adams, 1861)
- Hypermastus colmani (Warén, 1991)
- Hypermastus coxi (Pilsbry, 1899)
- Hypermastus cylindricus (Sowerby III, 1900)
- Hypermastus echinocardiophilus (Habe, 1976)
- Hypermastus echinodisci (Warén, 1980)
- Hypermastus epeterion (Melvill, 1889)
- Hypermastus epiphanes (Melvill, 1897)
- Hypermastus georgiregis (Cotton & Godfrey, 1932)
- Hypermastus indistinctus (Thiele, 1925)
- Hypermastus kilburni (Warén, 1991)
- Hypermastus mareticola (Warén & Norris, 1994)
- Hypermastus minor (Warén, 1991)
- Hypermastus mucronatus (Sowerby II, 1866)
- Hypermastus obliquistomum (Warén, 1991)
- Hypermastus orstomi (Warén, 1994)
- Hypermastus peronellicola (Kuroda & Habe, 1950)
- Hypermastus philippianus (Dunker, 1860)
- Hypermastus placentae (Warén & Crossland, 1991)
- Hypermastus productus (Sowerby III, 1894)
- Hypermastus pusillus (Sowerby I, 1834)
- Hypermastus randolphi (Vanatta, 1900)
- Hypermastus roemerianus Matsuda, Uyeno & Nagasawa, 2013
- Hypermastus rosa (Willett, 1944)
- Hypermastus ryukyeunsis (Matsuda, Uyeno & Nagasawa, 2010)
- Hypermastus sauliae (Warén, 1980)
- Hypermastus serratus (Warén, 1991)
- Hypermastus subula (A. Adams, 1864)
- Hypermastus tenuissimae (Warén, 1991)
- Hypermastus tokunagai (Yokoyama, 1922)
- Hypermastus williamsi (Cotton & Godfrey, 1932)

Species brought into synonymy

- Hypermastus bountyensis (Powell, 1933): synonym of Pelseneeria bountyensis (Powell, 1933)
- Hypermastus bulbula (R. Murdoch & Suter, 1906): synonym of Hypermastus bulbulus (Murdoch & Suter, 1906)
- Hypermastus cookeanus (Bartsch, 1917): synonym of Stilapex cookeanus (Bartsch, 1917)
- Hypermastus dunkerianus (Pilsbry, 1901): synonym of Hypermastus philippiana (Dunker, 1860)
- Hypermastus lacteus (A. Adams, 1864): synonym of Melanella tanabensis Takano, Tanaka & Kano, 2019
- Hypermastus roemeriana Matsuda, Uyeno & Nagasawa, 2013 a: synonym of Hypermastus roemerianus Matsuda, Uyeno & Nagasawa, 2013
