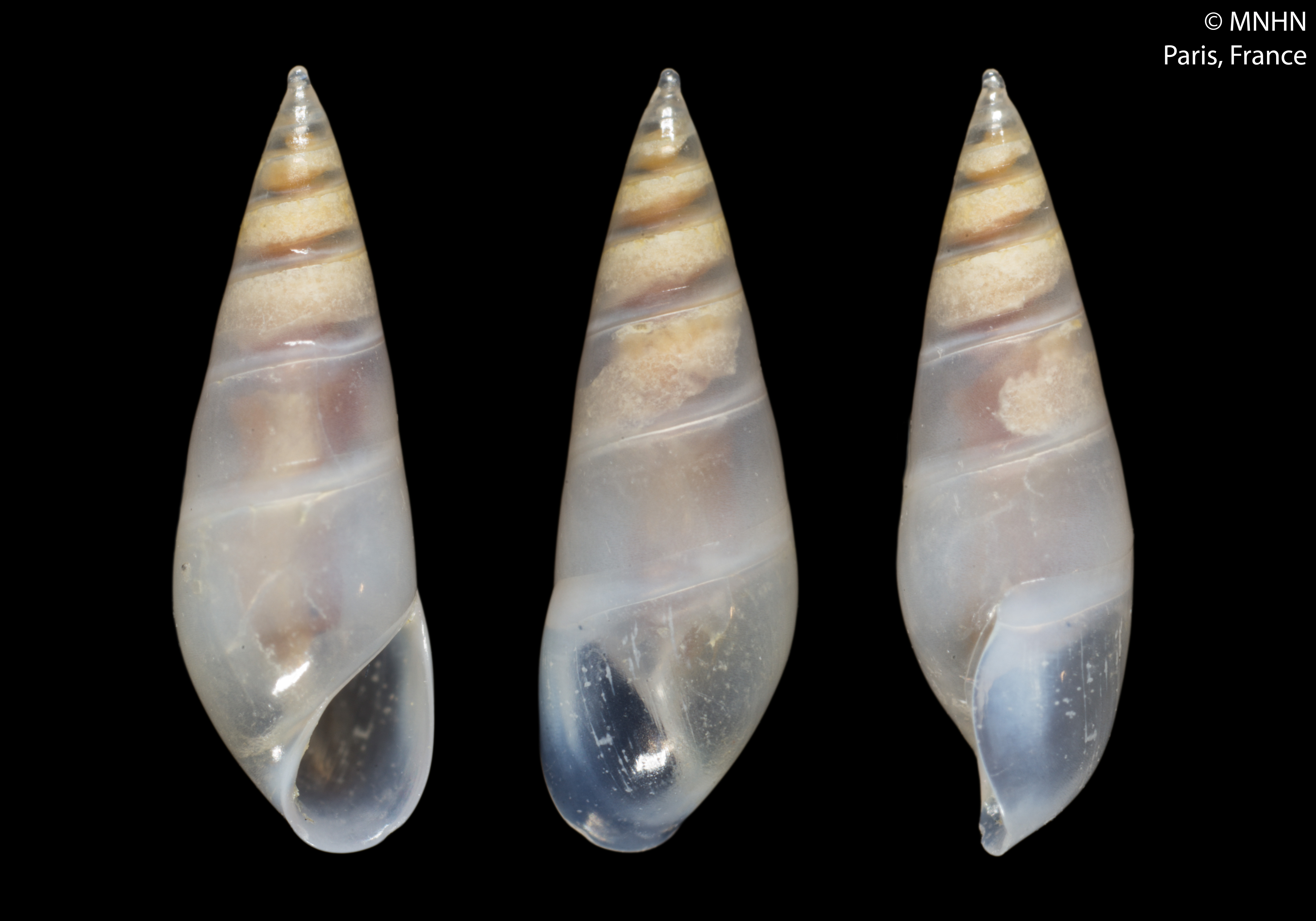
- Shell of Hypermastus orstomi (holotype at MNHN, Paris)

Scientific classification
- Kingdom: Animalia
- Phylum: Mollusca
- Class: Gastropoda
- Subclass: Caenogastropoda
- Order: Littorinimorpha
- Family: Eulimidae
- Genus: Hypermastus
- Species: H. orstomi

Binomial name
- Hypermastus orstomi Warén, 1994

= Hypermastus orstomi =

Species of gastropod

Hypermastus orstomi is a species of sea snail, a marine gastropod mollusk in the family Eulimidae.

== Distribution ==
The shell of Hypermastus orstomi reaches a length of approximately 6 mm. Like other members of the Eulimidae family, it exhibits a slender and elongated shape, adapted for its parasitic lifestyle.This marine species occurs off New Caledonia.

== Habitat and distribution ==
This species is found in marine environments off New Caledonia. It is known to be parasitic on irregular sea urchins, a characteristic trait of many eulimid gastropods.
