= Hypermastus obliquistomum =

Scientific classification
- Kingdom: Animalia
- Phylum: Mollusca
- Class: Gastropoda
- Subclass: Caenogastropoda
- Order: Littorinimorpha
- Family: Eulimidae
- Genus: Hypermastus
- Species: H. obliquistomum

Binomial name
- Hypermastus obliquistomum Warén, 1991

Species of gastropod

Hypermastus obliquistomum is a species of sea snail, a marine gastropod mollusk in the family Eulimidae.
