= Volvarina ingolfi =

Scientific classification
- Kingdom: Animalia
- Phylum: Mollusca
- Class: Gastropoda
- Subclass: Caenogastropoda
- Order: Neogastropoda
- Family: Marginellidae
- Subfamily: Marginellinae
- Genus: Volvarina
- Species: V. ingolfi

Binomial name
- Volvarina ingolfi Bouchet & Warén, 1985

Species of gastropod

Volvarina ingolfi is a species of sea snail, a marine gastropod mollusk in the family Marginellidae, the margin snails.

== Description ==
The length of the shell attains 14.5 mm, its diameter 7.6 mm.

This species is remarkable for having only three columellar folds.

== Distribution ==
This marine species is the northernmost Atlantic volvarina.
