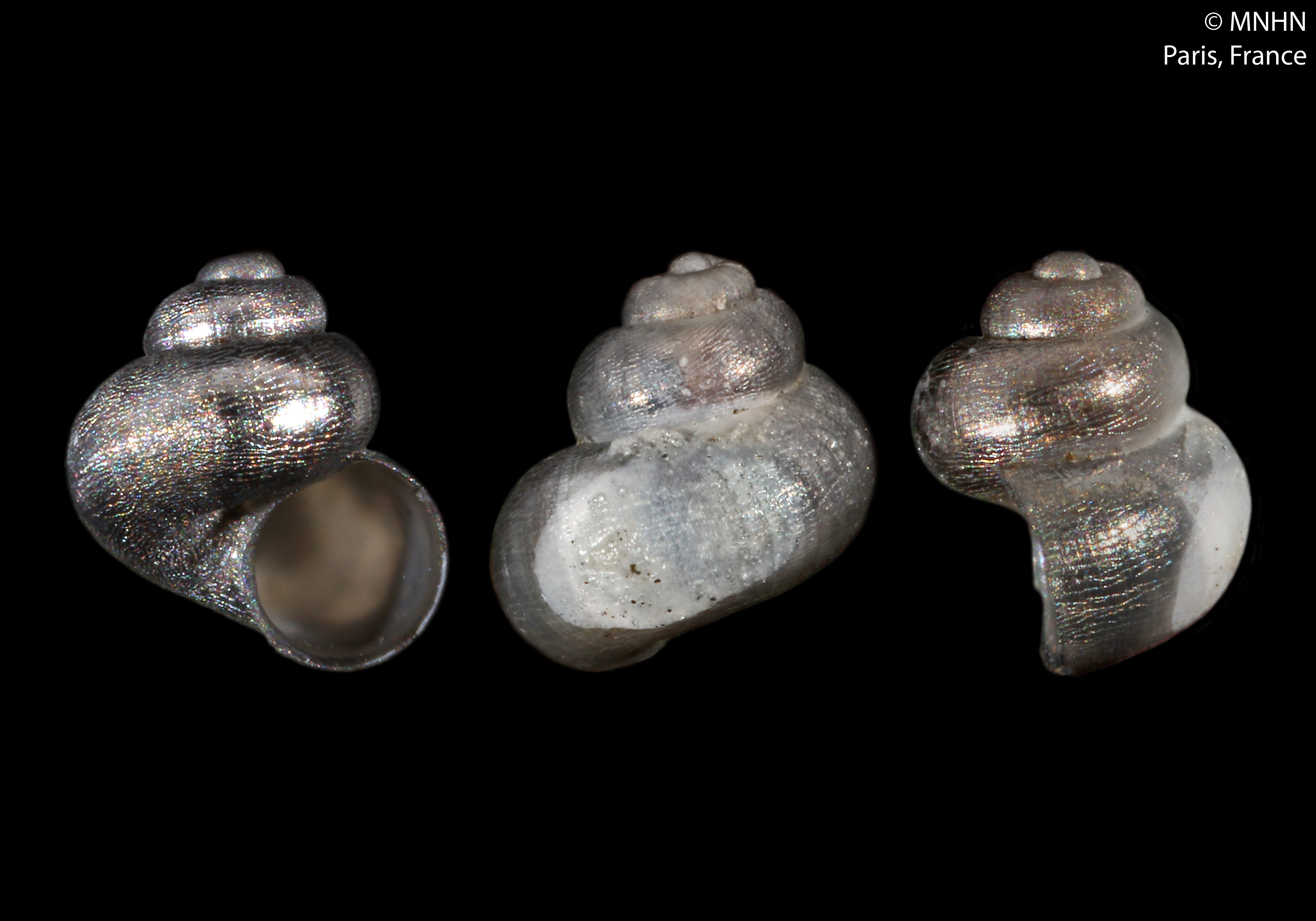
- Shell of Anekes sculpturata (holotype at MNHN, Paris)

Scientific classification
- Kingdom: Animalia
- Phylum: Mollusca
- Class: Gastropoda
- Subclass: Vetigastropoda
- Superfamily: Seguenzioidea
- Genus: Anekes
- Species: A. sculpturata

Binomial name
- Anekes sculpturata Warén, 1992

Synonyms
- Anekes undilisculpta Bogi, C. & I. Nofroni, 1989 (misspelled specific name)

= Anekes sculpturata =

Species of gastropod

Anekes sculpturata is a species of sea snail, a marine gastropod mollusk, unassigned in the superfamily Seguenzioidea.

== Description ==
The length of the shell attains 1 mm.

== Distribution ==
This species occurs in the Bay of Biscay and in the Mediterranean Sea.
