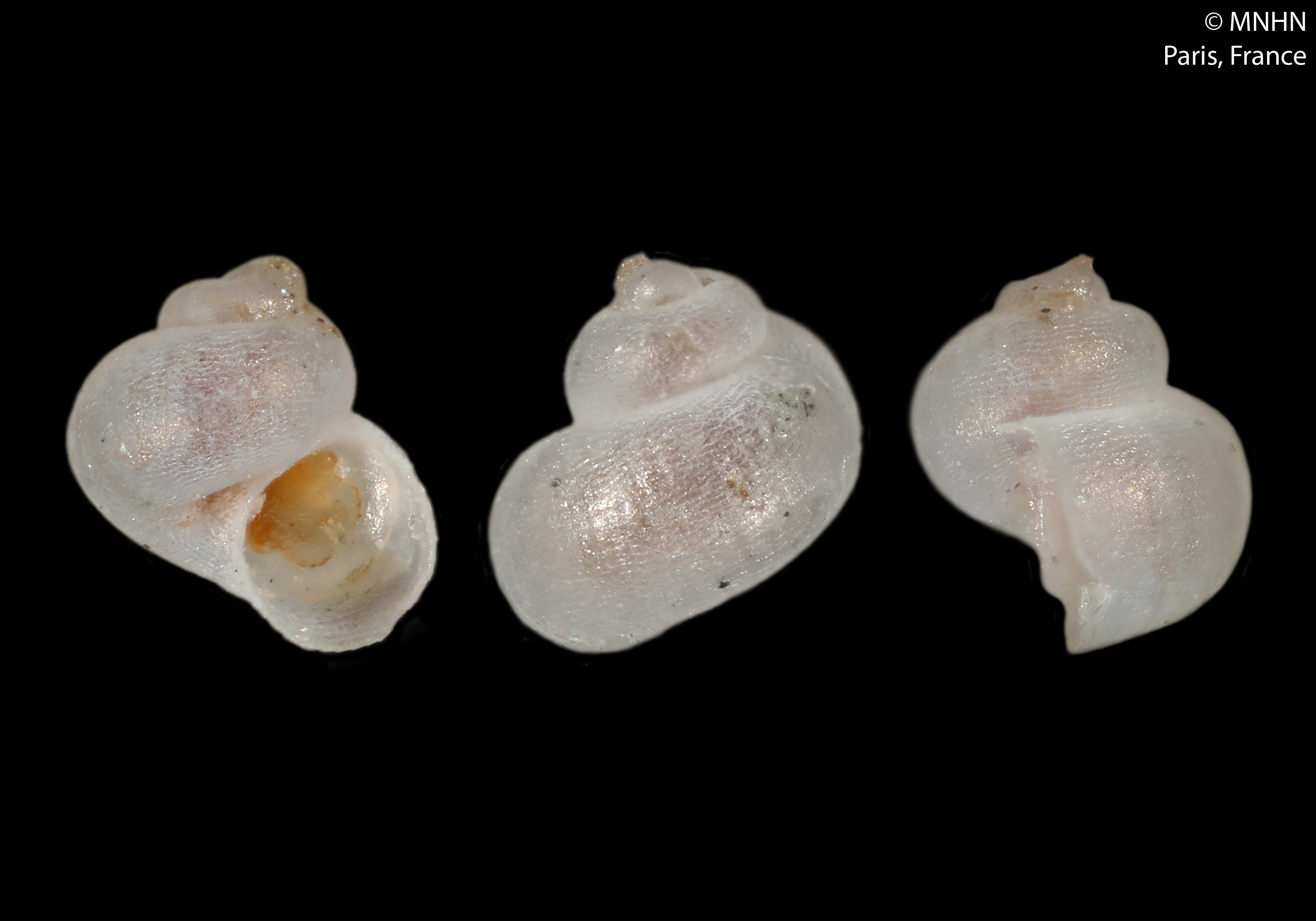
- Shell of Anekes undulisculpta (holotype at MNHN, Paris)

Scientific classification
- Kingdom: Animalia
- Phylum: Mollusca
- Class: Gastropoda
- Subclass: Vetigastropoda
- Superfamily: Seguenzioidea
- Genus: Anekes
- Species: A. undulisculpta

Binomial name
- Anekes undulisculpta Bouchet & Warén, 1979

= Anekes undulisculpta =

Species of gastropod

Anekes undulisculpta is a species of sea snail, a marine gastropod mollusk, unassigned in the superfamily Seguenzioidea.

== Description ==
The size varies between 0.6 mm and 0.9 mm. It is colored white.

== Distribution ==
This bathyal species occurs in Arctic waters off Norway.
