= Retiskenea =

Scientific classification
- Kingdom: Animalia
- Phylum: Mollusca
- Class: Gastropoda
- Subclass: Vetigastropoda
- Superfamily: Neomphaloidea
- Genus: Retiskenea; Warén & Bouchet, 2001

Genus of gastropods

Retiskenea is a genus of sea snails, marine gastropod mollusks in the superfamily Neomphaloidea.

== Species ==
Species within the genus Retiskenea include:

- Retiskenea diploura Warén & Bouchet, 2001
- † Retiskenea kieli K. A. Campbell, Peterson & Alfaro, 2008
- † Retiskenea statura (Goedert & Benham, 1999)
- † Retiskenea tuberculata K. A. Campbell, Peterson & Alfaro, 2008
