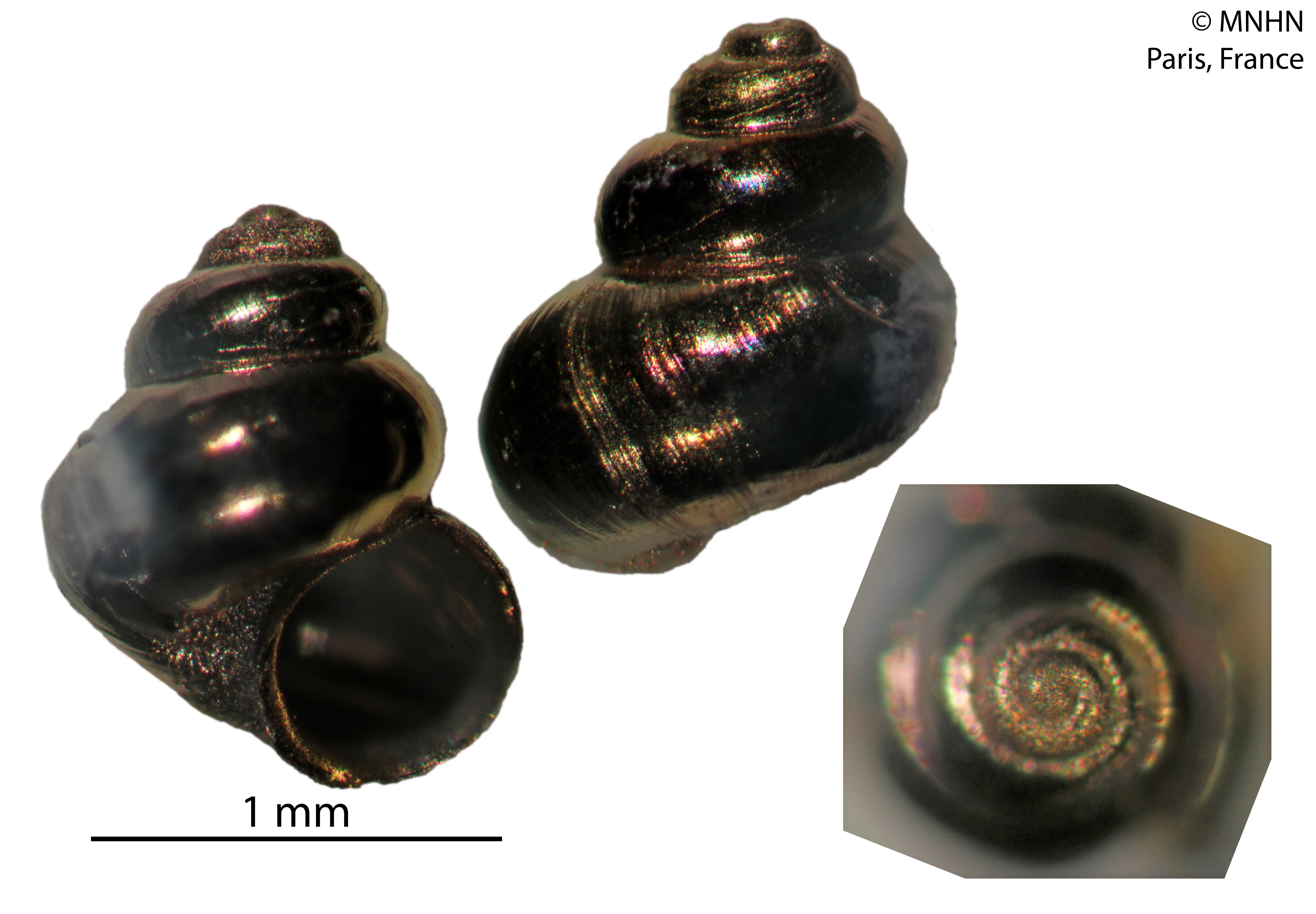
- Shell of Anekes paucistriata (paratype at MNHN, Paris)

Scientific classification
- Kingdom: Animalia
- Phylum: Mollusca
- Class: Gastropoda
- Subclass: Vetigastropoda
- Superfamily: Seguenzioidea
- Genus: Anekes
- Species: A. paucistriata

Binomial name
- Anekes paucistriata Warén, 1992

= Anekes paucistriata =

Species of gastropod

Anekes paucistriata is a species of sea snail, a marine gastropod mollusk, unranked in the superfamily Seguenzioidea.

== Description ==
The size of the shell varies between 1 mm and 1.5 mm.

== Distribution ==
This species occurs in the Atlantic Ocean on the Gorringe Ridge and off Madeira; in the Mediterranean Sea.
