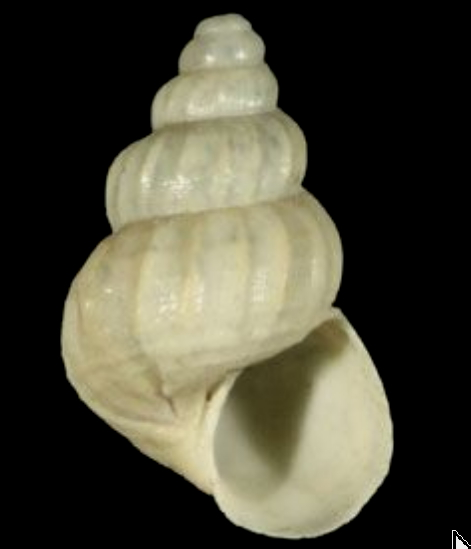
- Shell of Alvania pseudoareolata (specimen at the Natural History Museum, Rotterdam)

Scientific classification
- Kingdom: Animalia
- Phylum: Mollusca
- Class: Gastropoda
- Subclass: Caenogastropoda
- Order: Littorinimorpha
- Superfamily: Rissooidea
- Family: Rissoidae
- Genus: Alvania
- Species: A. pseudoareolata

Binomial name
- Alvania pseudoareolata Warén, 1974

= Alvania pseudoareolata =

Species of gastropod

Alvania pseudoareolata is a species of small sea snail, a marine gastropod mollusk or micromollusk in the family Rissoidae.

== Distribution ==
This species occurs in the Atlantic Ocean off North Carolina, USA and the Gulf of St. Lawrence.

== Description ==
The maximum recorded shell length is 2.9 mm.

== Habitat ==
Minimum recorded depth is 18 m. Maximum recorded depth is 808 m.
