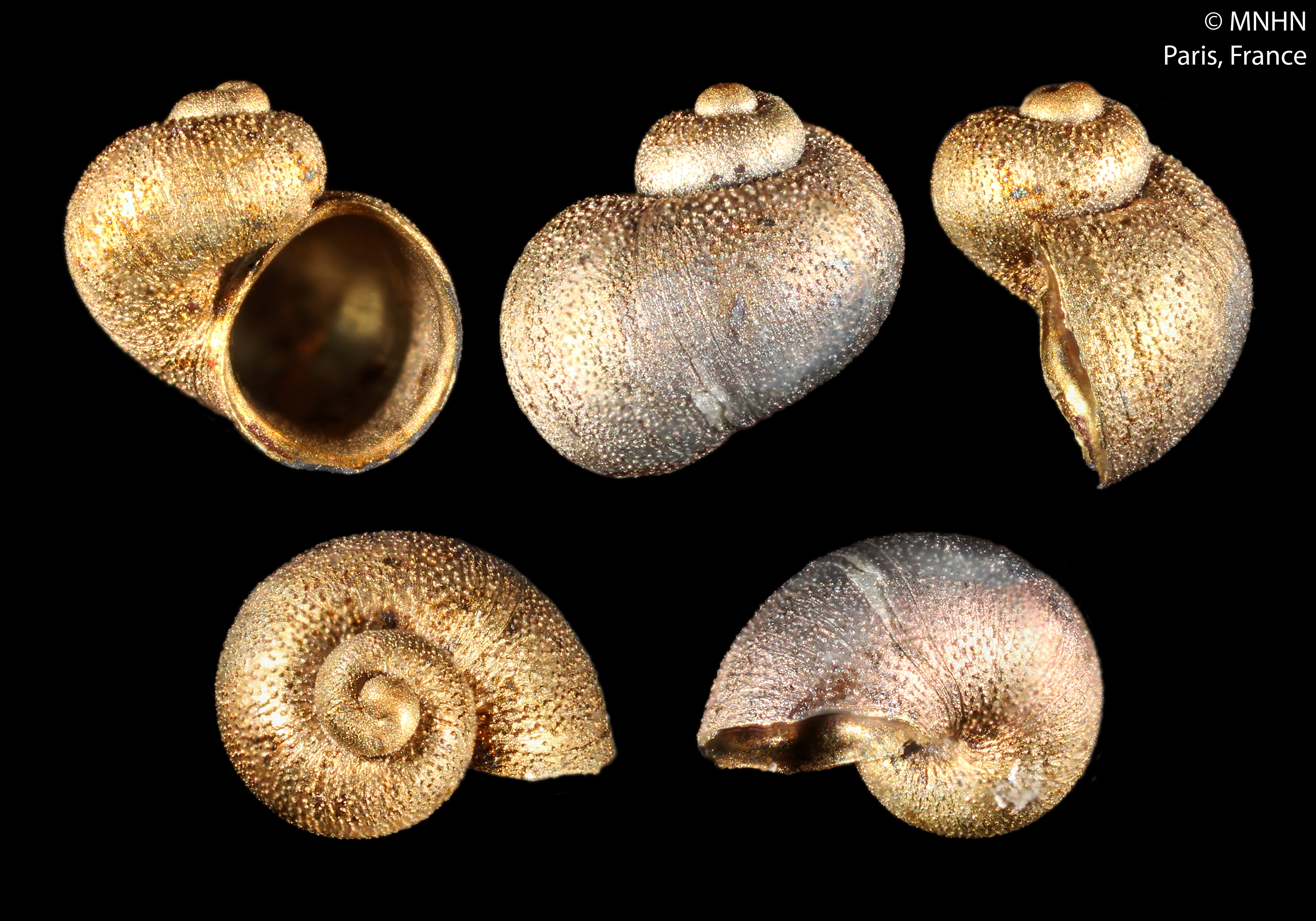
- Shell of Granigyra granulifera (holotype at MNHN, Paris)

Scientific classification
- Kingdom: Animalia
- Phylum: Mollusca
- Class: Gastropoda
- Subclass: Vetigastropoda
- Family: incertae sedis
- Genus: Granigyra
- Species: G. granulifera

Binomial name
- Granigyra granulifera Warén, 1992

= Granigyra granulifera =

Species of gastropod

Granigyra granulifera is a species of sea snail, a marine gastropod mollusk, unassigned in the superfamily Seguenzioidea.

== Description ==
The size of the shell varies between 1.3 mm and 1.7 mm.

== Distribution ==
This species is found at bathyal depths in the Mediterranean Sea; in the Atlantic Ocean off Madeira and the Bay of Biscay.
