= Granigyra arenosa =

Scientific classification
- Kingdom: Animalia
- Phylum: Mollusca
- Class: Gastropoda
- Subclass: Vetigastropoda
- Family: incertae sedis
- Genus: Granigyra
- Species: G. arenosa

Binomial name
- Granigyra arenosa Warén, 1993

Species of gastropod

Granigyra arenosa is a species of sea snail, a marine gastropod mollusk, unassigned in the superfamily Seguenzioidea.

== Description ==
The shell grows to a height of 2 mm.

== Distribution ==
This species is found in European waters off the Faroe Islands to Southwest Portugal.
