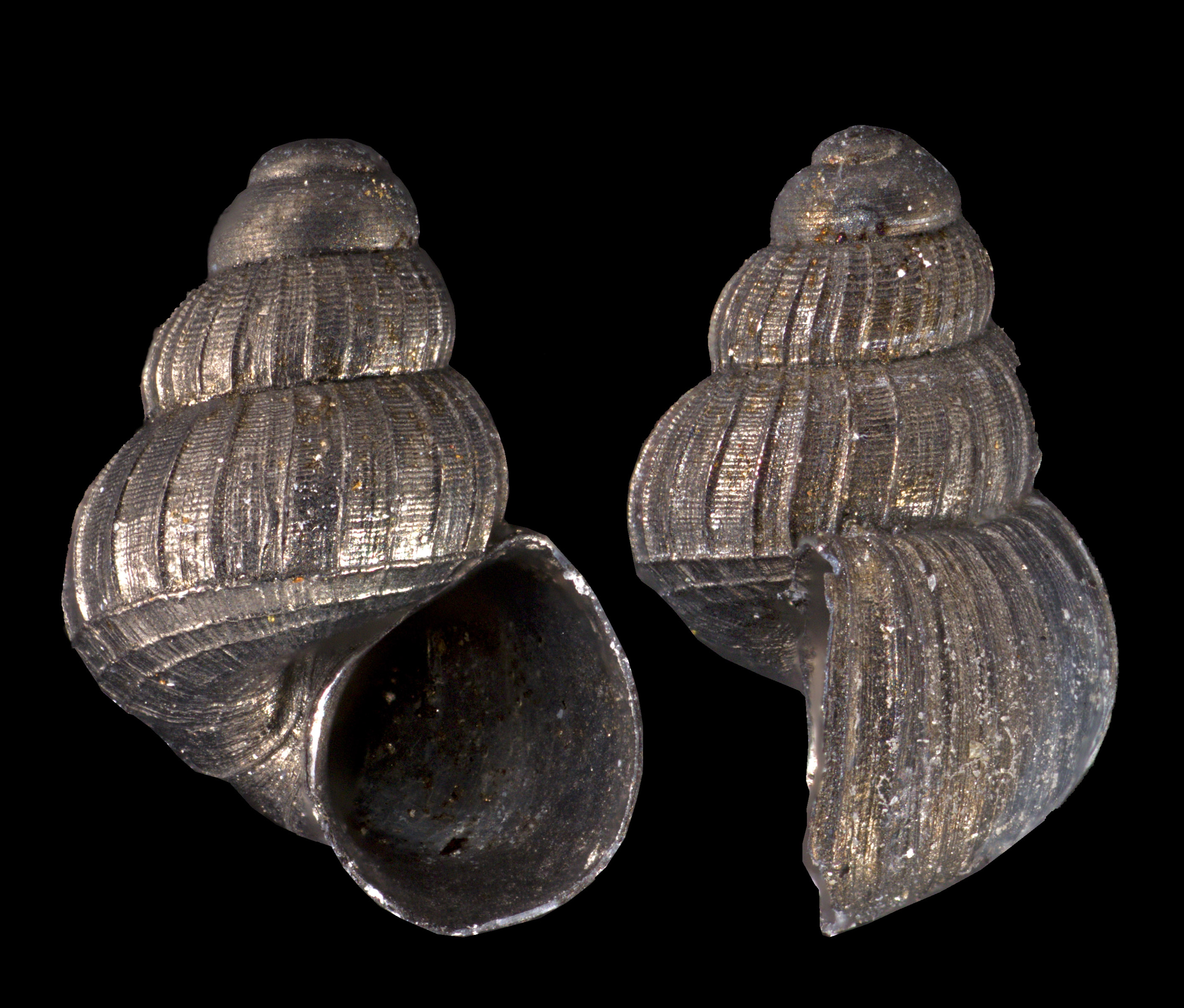
- Shell of Alvania stenolopha (holotype at MNHN, Paris)

Scientific classification
- Kingdom: Animalia
- Phylum: Mollusca
- Class: Gastropoda
- Subclass: Caenogastropoda
- Order: Littorinimorpha
- Family: Rissoidae
- Genus: Alvania
- Species: A. stenolopha

Binomial name
- Alvania stenolopha Bouchet & Warén, 1993

= Alvania stenolopha =

Species of gastropod

Alvania stenolopha is a species of minute sea snail, a marine gastropod mollusk or micromollusk in the family Rissoidae.

== Description ==
The length of the shell attains 1.65 mm.

== Distribution ==
This species occurs in the Atlantic Ocean off the Azores.
