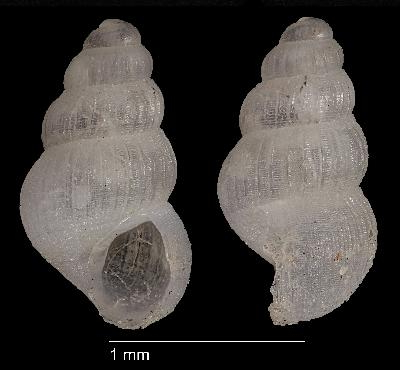
- Shell of Alvania adinogramma (holotype at MNHN, Paris)

Scientific classification
- Kingdom: Animalia
- Phylum: Mollusca
- Class: Gastropoda
- Subclass: Caenogastropoda
- Order: Littorinimorpha
- Family: Rissoidae
- Genus: Alvania
- Species: A. adinogramma

Binomial name
- Alvania adinogramma Bouchet & Warén, 1993

= Alvania adinogramma =

Species of gastropod

Alvania adinogramma is a species of minute sea snail, a marine gastropod mollusk or micromollusk in the family Rissoidae.

== Description ==
The length of the shell varies between 1.5 mm and 3 mm.

== Distribution ==
This deep-sea species occurs in the Atlantic Sea off the Azores and in the northeast Atlantic.
