= Alvania pseudosyngenes =

Scientific classification
- Kingdom: Animalia
- Phylum: Mollusca
- Class: Gastropoda
- Subclass: Caenogastropoda
- Order: Littorinimorpha
- Family: Rissoidae
- Genus: Alvania
- Species: A. pseudosyngenes

Binomial name
- Alvania pseudosyngenes Warén, 1973

Synonyms
- Cingula syngenes Verrill, 1884; Rissoa syngenes A. E. Verrill, 1884 sensu Friele & Grieg, 1901 ·

Species of gastropod

Alvania pseudosyngenes is a species of small sea snail, a marine gastropod mollusk or micromollusk in the family Rissoidae.

== Distribution ==
This species occurs in the Atlantic Ocean off Northern Norway.

== Description ==
The maximum recorded shell length is 3.5 mm.

== Habitat ==
Minimum recorded depth is 199 m. Maximum recorded depth is 199 m.
