= Alvania angularis =

Scientific classification
- Kingdom: Animalia
- Phylum: Mollusca
- Class: Gastropoda
- Subclass: Caenogastropoda
- Order: Littorinimorpha
- Superfamily: Rissooidea
- Family: Rissoidae
- Genus: Alvania
- Species: A. angularis

Binomial name
- Alvania angularis (Warén, 1996)

Species of gastropod

Alvania angularis is a species of minute sea snail, a marine gastropod mollusk or micromollusk in the family Rissoidae. It is characterized by its small size, spiral-shaped shell, and distinctive angular whorls.

== Distribution ==
Distribution of Alvania angularis include:

- Iceland

The type locality is off northwestern Iceland (66°31' N, 25°37' W) in the depth 659 m.
