= Lissotesta major =

Scientific classification
- Kingdom: Animalia
- Phylum: Mollusca
- Class: Gastropoda
- Subclass: Vetigastropoda
- Family: incertae sedis
- Genus: Lissotesta
- Species: L. major

Binomial name
- Lissotesta major Warén, 1992

Species of gastropod

Lissotesta major is a species of sea snail, a marine gastropod mollusk, unassigned in the superfamily Seguenzioidea.

== Description ==
The shell grows to a height of 1.5 mm.

== Distribution ==
This species occurs in the Atlantic Ocean off Western Portugal.
