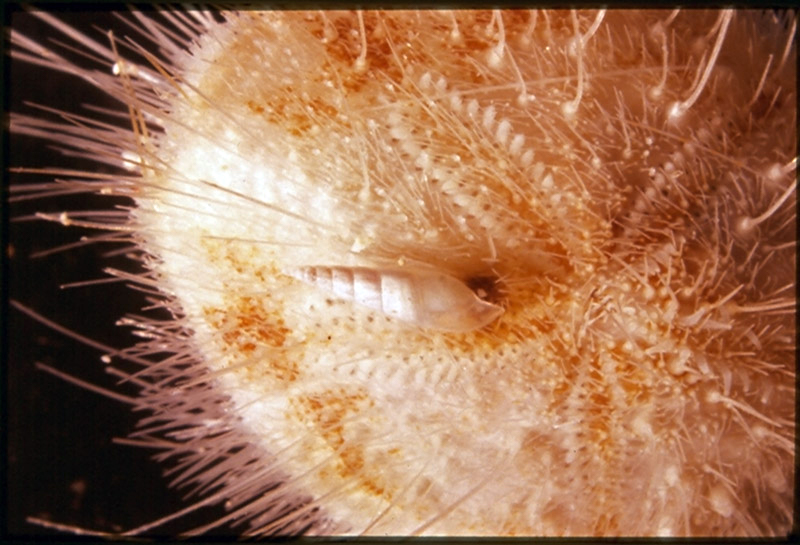
- Hypermastus mareticola on the aboral surface of Maretia planulata

Scientific classification
- Kingdom: Animalia
- Phylum: Mollusca
- Class: Gastropoda
- Subclass: Caenogastropoda
- Order: Littorinimorpha
- Family: Eulimidae
- Genus: Hypermastus
- Species: H. mareticola

Binomial name
- Hypermastus mareticola Warén & Norris, 1994

= Hypermastus mareticola =

Species of gastropod

Hypermastus mareticola is a species of sea snail, a marine gastropod mollusk in the family Eulimidae.

Discovered by Daniel Ray Norris (1992) in Apra Harbor, Guam. H. mareticola was found as a parasite of the irregular sea urchin Maretia planulata.

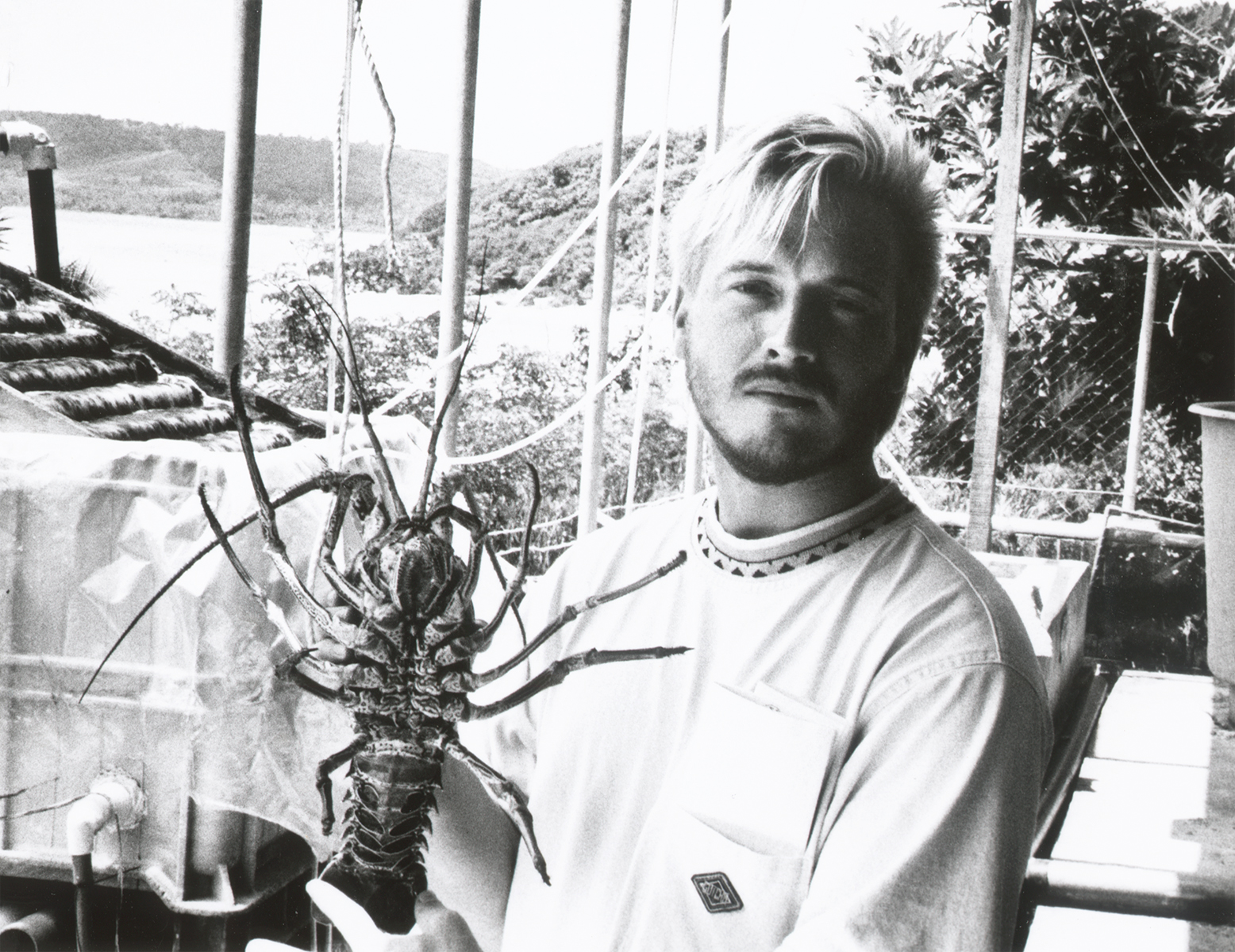
Daniel Ray Norris with lobster at UOG Marine Laboratory
