= Retiskenea diploura =

Scientific classification
- Kingdom: Animalia
- Phylum: Mollusca
- Class: Gastropoda
- Subclass: Vetigastropoda
- Genus: Retiskenea
- Species: R. diploura

Binomial name
- Retiskenea diploura Warén & Bouchet, 2001

Species of gastropod

Retiskenea diploura is a species of sea snail, a marine gastropod mollusk in the superfamily Neomphaloidea.

== Distribution ==
This marine species occurs off Japan and the Pacific coast of the USA.
