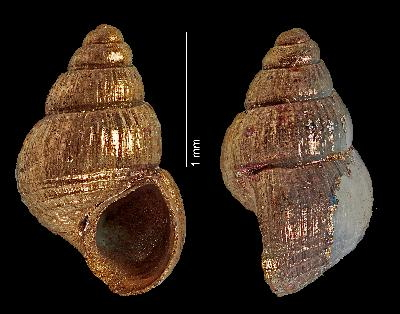
- Shell of Alvania adiaphoros (holotype at MNHN, Paris)

Scientific classification
- Kingdom: Animalia
- Phylum: Mollusca
- Class: Gastropoda
- Subclass: Caenogastropoda
- Order: Littorinimorpha
- Family: Rissoidae
- Genus: Alvania
- Species: A. adiaphoros

Binomial name
- Alvania adiaphoros Bouchet & Warén, 1993

= Alvania adiaphoros =

Species of gastropod

Alvania adiaphoros is a species of small sea snail, a marine gastropod mollusk or micromollusk in the family Rissoidae.

== Description ==
The length of the shell attains 2.03 mm.

== Distribution ==
This marine species occurs off the Azores. This species can only be found along the costal areas.
