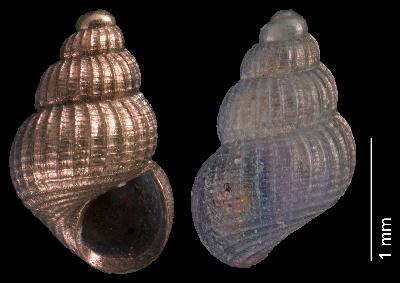
- Shell of Alvania cancapae (paratype at MNHN, Paris)

Scientific classification
- Kingdom: Animalia
- Phylum: Mollusca
- Class: Gastropoda
- Subclass: Caenogastropoda
- Order: Littorinimorpha
- Family: Rissoidae
- Genus: Alvania
- Species: A. cancapae

Binomial name
- Alvania cancapae Bouchet & Warén, 1993

= Alvania cancapae =

Species of gastropod

Alvania cancapae is a species of minute sea snail, a marine gastropod mollusk or micromollusk in the family Rissoidae.

== Description ==
The shell boasts rigid edges and a turbinate shape, with notably unique colouring. The length of the shell attains 3 mm.

== Distribution ==
This marine species occurs off Madeira The Canary Islands and southern Morocco.
