= Volvarina innexa =

Scientific classification
- Kingdom: Animalia
- Phylum: Mollusca
- Class: Gastropoda
- Subclass: Caenogastropoda
- Order: Neogastropoda
- Family: Marginellidae
- Subfamily: Marginellinae
- Genus: Volvarina
- Species: V. innexa

Binomial name
- Volvarina innexa Bouchet & Warén, 1985

Species of gastropod

Volvarina innexa is a species of sea snail, a marine gastropod mollusk in the family Marginellidae, the margin snails.

== Description ==
The length of the shell attains 5.3 mm, its diameter 2.2 mm.

== Distribution ==
This marine species occurs off the Galapagos Islands
