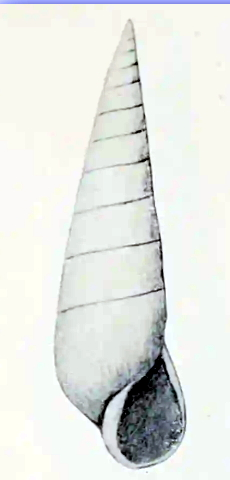
- Shell of Hypermastus pusillus (original image)

Scientific classification
- Kingdom: Animalia
- Phylum: Mollusca
- Class: Gastropoda
- Subclass: Caenogastropoda
- Order: Littorinimorpha
- Family: Eulimidae
- Genus: Hypermastus
- Species: H. pusillus

Binomial name
- Hypermastus pusillus (G.B. Sowerby I, 1834)

Synonyms
- Eulimella hastata G.B. Sowerby I, 1834; Eulima pusilla G.B. Sowerby I, 1834; Melanella (melanella) pusilla G.B. Sowerby I, 1834

= Hypermastus pusillus =

Species of gastropod

Hypermastus pusillus is a species of sea snail, a marine gastropod mollusk in the family Eulimidae.

== Description ==
(Original description) The shell is straight and subulate in outline, thin and translucent, with a pure white, almost transparent surface. The whorls are only slightly convex. The aperture is elongate-oval in shape and tapers to a point posteriorly.
