= Granigyra nipponica =

Scientific classification
- Kingdom: Animalia
- Phylum: Mollusca
- Class: Gastropoda
- Subclass: Vetigastropoda
- Family: incertae sedis
- Genus: Granigyra
- Species: G. nipponica

Binomial name
- Granigyra nipponica (Okutani, 1964)

Species of gastropod

Granigyra nipponica is a species of sea snail, a marine gastropod mollusk, unassigned in the superfamily Seguenzioidea.
