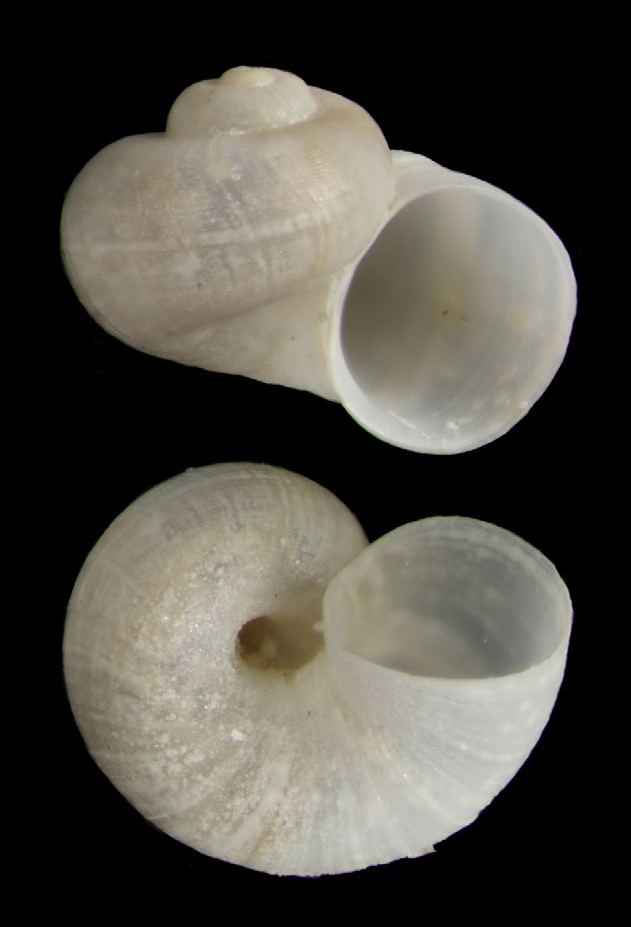
- Shell of Granigyra tenera

Scientific classification
- Kingdom: Animalia
- Phylum: Mollusca
- Class: Gastropoda
- Subclass: Vetigastropoda
- Family: incertae sedis
- Genus: Granigyra
- Species: G. tenera

Binomial name
- Granigyra tenera (Jeffreys, 1883)

Synonyms
- Cyclostrema tenera Jeffreys 1883

= Granigyra tenera =

Species of gastropod

Granigyra tenera is a species of sea snail, a marine gastropod mollusk, unassigned in the superfamily Seguenzioidea.

== Description ==
The shell grows to a height of 1.8 mm. The thin shell is narrowly umbilicated. It is semitransparent, lustreless, with nearly microscopic spiral stride, which are wanting on the base and replaced by a rugose or fretted appearance. The color of the shell is pale yellowish white, with a faint greenish tinge. The four whorls are convex. The suture is very deep. The aperture is circular. The thin peristome is slightly expanded.

== Distribution ==
This species occurs in the Atlantic Ocean off Portugal.
