= Lissotesta benthicola =

Scientific classification
- Kingdom: Animalia
- Phylum: Mollusca
- Class: Gastropoda
- Subclass: Vetigastropoda
- Family: incertae sedis
- Genus: Lissotesta
- Species: L. benthicola

Binomial name
- Lissotesta benthicola Powell, 1927

Species of gastropod

Lissotesta benthicola is a species of small sea snail, a marine gastropod mollusc, unassigned in the superfamily Seguenzioidea.

== Distribution ==
This marine species occurs off New Zealand.
