= Lissotesta minima =

Scientific classification
- Kingdom: Animalia
- Phylum: Mollusca
- Class: Gastropoda
- Subclass: Vetigastropoda
- Family: incertae sedis
- Genus: Lissotesta
- Species: L. minima

Binomial name
- Lissotesta minima (Seguenza, 1876)

Synonyms
- Margarites minimus Seguenza, 1876 (original combination); Trochus minutulus Jeffreys 1883

Species of gastropod

Lissotesta minima is a species of sea snail, a marine gastropod mollusk, unassigned in the superfamily Seguenzioidea.

== Description ==
The size of the shell varies between 0.8 mm and 1.5 mm.

== Distribution ==
This bathyal species occurs in the Bay of Biscay, off Portugal; as a Late Pliocene fossil in Sicily.
