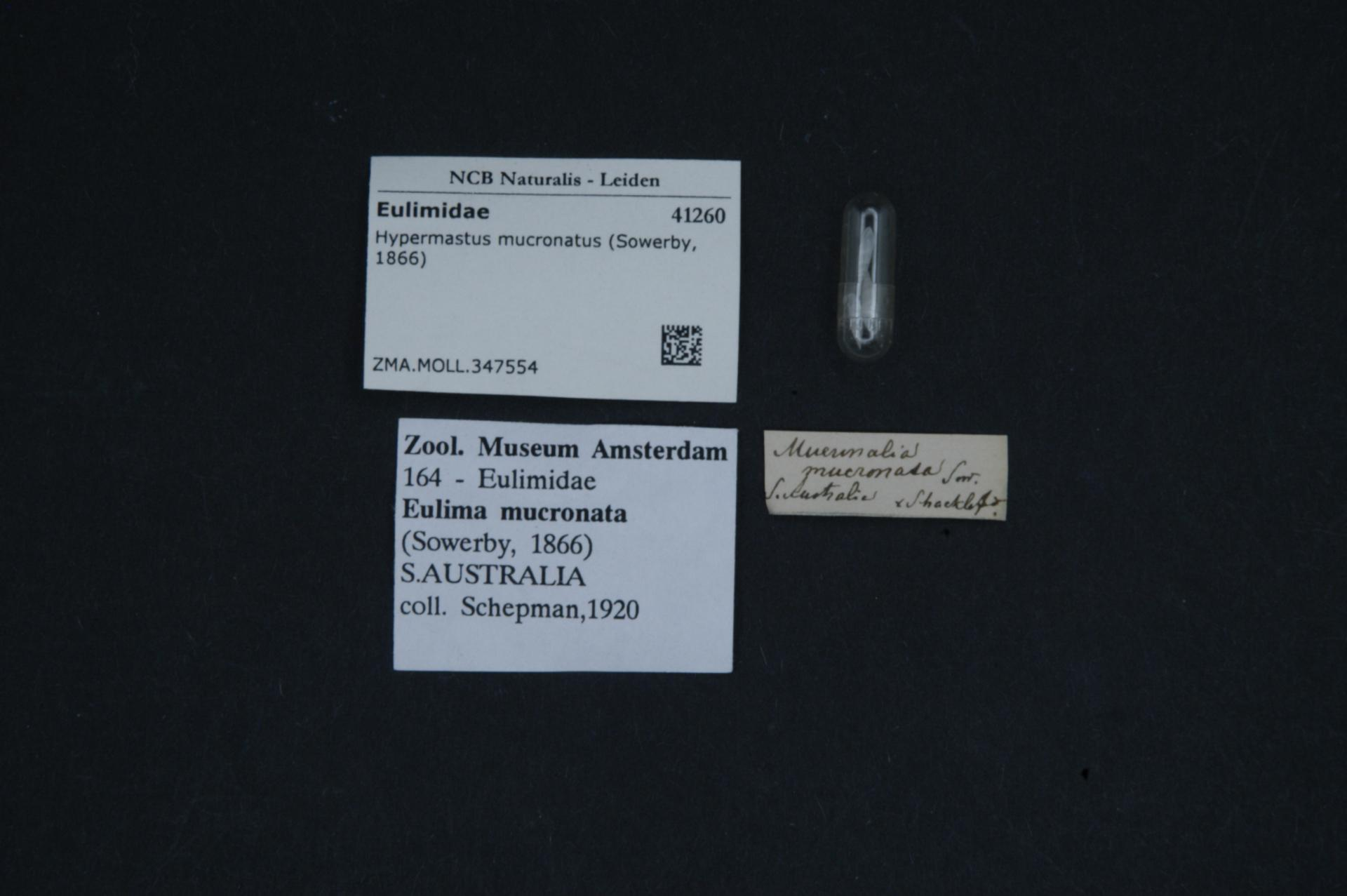

Scientific classification
- Kingdom: Animalia
- Phylum: Mollusca
- Class: Gastropoda
- Subclass: Caenogastropoda
- Order: Littorinimorpha
- Family: Eulimidae
- Genus: Hypermastus
- Species: H. mucronatus

Binomial name
- Hypermastus mucronatus G.B. Sowerby II, 1866

Synonyms
- Eulima mucronata G.B. Sowerby II, 1866

= Hypermastus mucronatus =

Species of gastropod

Hypermastus mucronatus is a species of sea snail, a marine gastropod mollusk in the family Eulimidae.
