= Hypermastus georgiregis =

Scientific classification
- Kingdom: Animalia
- Phylum: Mollusca
- Class: Gastropoda
- Subclass: Caenogastropoda
- Order: Littorinimorpha
- Family: Eulimidae
- Genus: Hypermastus
- Species: H. georgiregis

Binomial name
- Hypermastus georgiregis Cotton & Godfrey, 1932

Synonyms
- Eulima georgiregis Cotton & Godfrey, 1932

Species of gastropod

Hypermastus georgiregis is a species of sea snail, a marine gastropod mollusk in the family Eulimidae.
