= Lissotesta impervia =

Scientific classification
- Kingdom: Animalia
- Phylum: Mollusca
- Class: Gastropoda
- Subclass: Vetigastropoda
- Superfamily: Seguenzioidea
- Family: incertae sedis
- Genus: Lissotesta
- Species: L. impervia

Binomial name
- Lissotesta impervia (Strebel, 1908)

Synonyms
- Margarites impervia (Strebel, 1908); Photinula (Submargarita) impervia Strebel, 1908; Submargarita impervia (Strebel, 1908)

Species of gastropod

Lissotesta impervia is a species of sea snail, a marine gastropod mollusk, unassigned in the superfamily Seguenzioidea.

== Description ==
The length of the shell attains 2.7 mm.

== Distribution ==
This marine species occurs off Argentina (Santa Cruz) and in the subantarctic waters off South Georgia at depths between 110 m and 252 m.
