= Hypermastus epeterion =

Scientific classification
- Kingdom: Animalia
- Phylum: Mollusca
- Class: Gastropoda
- Subclass: Caenogastropoda
- Order: Littorinimorpha
- Family: Eulimidae
- Genus: Hypermastus
- Species: H. epeterion

Binomial name
- Hypermastus epeterion Melvill, 1889

Synonyms
- Eulima epeterion Melvill, 1889

Species of gastropod

Hypermastus epeterion is a species of sea snail, a marine gastropod mollusk in the family Eulimidae.
