= Lissotesta liratula =

Scientific classification
- Kingdom: Animalia
- Phylum: Mollusca
- Class: Gastropoda
- Subclass: Vetigastropoda
- Family: incertae sedis
- Genus: Lissotesta
- Species: L. liratula

Binomial name
- Lissotesta liratula (Pelseneer, 1903)

Synonyms
- Cyclostrema liratulum Pelseneer, 1903 (original combination)

Species of gastropod

Lissotesta liratula is a species of sea snail, a marine gastropod mollusk in the superfamily Seguenzioidea.

== Description ==
The shell was collected during the Belgian Antarctic Expedition on 18 October 1898. It was found to attain a height of 1.1 mm. The species is characterized by numerous spirals. Compared to lissotesta similis, liraluta has a wider umbilicus.

== Distribution ==
This species is found in Antarctic waters: Weddell Sea, Bellingshausen Sea at a depth of 500 m.
