= Lissotesta studeri =

Scientific classification
- Kingdom: Animalia
- Phylum: Mollusca
- Class: Gastropoda
- Subclass: Vetigastropoda
- Superfamily: Seguenzioidea
- Family: incertae sedis
- Genus: Lissotesta
- Species: L. studeri

Binomial name
- Lissotesta studeri (Thiele, 1912)

Synonyms
- Submargarita studeri Thiele, 1912

Species of gastropod

Lissotesta studeri is a species of sea snail, a marine gastropod mollusk, unassigned in the superfamily Seguenzioidea.
