= Lissotesta macknighti =

Scientific classification
- Kingdom: Animalia
- Phylum: Mollusca
- Class: Gastropoda
- Subclass: Vetigastropoda
- Superfamily: Seguenzioidea
- Family: incertae sedis
- Genus: Lissotesta
- Species: L. macknighti

Binomial name
- Lissotesta macknighti (Dell, 1990)

Synonyms
- Submargarita macknighti Dell, 1990

Species of mollusc

Lissotesta macknighti is a species of sea snail, a marine gastropod mollusk, unassigned in the superfamily Seguenzioidea.
