= Lissotesta unifilosa =

Scientific classification
- Kingdom: Animalia
- Phylum: Mollusca
- Class: Gastropoda
- Subclass: Vetigastropoda
- Superfamily: Seguenzioidea
- Family: incertae sedis
- Genus: Lissotesta
- Species: L. unifilosa

Binomial name
- Lissotesta unifilosa (Thiele, 1912)

Synonyms
- Lapidicola gyratum Egorova, 1972; Submargarita unifilosa Thiele, 1912

Species of gastropod

Lissotesta unifilosa is a species of sea snail, a marine gastropod mollusk, unassigned in the superfamily Seguenzioidea.

== Description ==
The height of the shell reaches 2 mm.

== Distribution ==
This marine species occurs off South Georgia and the Antarctic Peninsula at depths between 94 m and 120 m.
