= Granigyra spinulosa =

Scientific classification
- Domain: Eukaryota
- Kingdom: Animalia
- Phylum: Mollusca
- Class: Gastropoda
- Subclass: Vetigastropoda
- Family: incertae sedis
- Genus: Granigyra
- Species: G. spinulosa

Binomial name
- Granigyra spinulosa Bush, 1897

Synonyms
- Ganesa spinulosa (Bush, 1897)

Species of gastropod

Granigyra spinulosa is a species of sea snail, a marine gastropod mollusk in the superfamily Seguenzioidea.

== Description ==
The shell grows to a height of 2.5 mm. The shell has a delicate yellow color with coarse and very conspicuous granulation of the surface. When seen in profile, they appear like little spines. It has about three well-rounded, rather loosely coiled whorls, forming an elevated spire with relatively large, prominent nuclear whorl and a very large body whorl. The well-marked suture is rather deep. The deep umbilicus is relatively large and has rounded walls. The peritreme of the aperture is slightly attached at the suture.

== Distribution ==
This species occurs in the Atlantic Ocean off the Bahamas, found at a depth of over 600 m.
