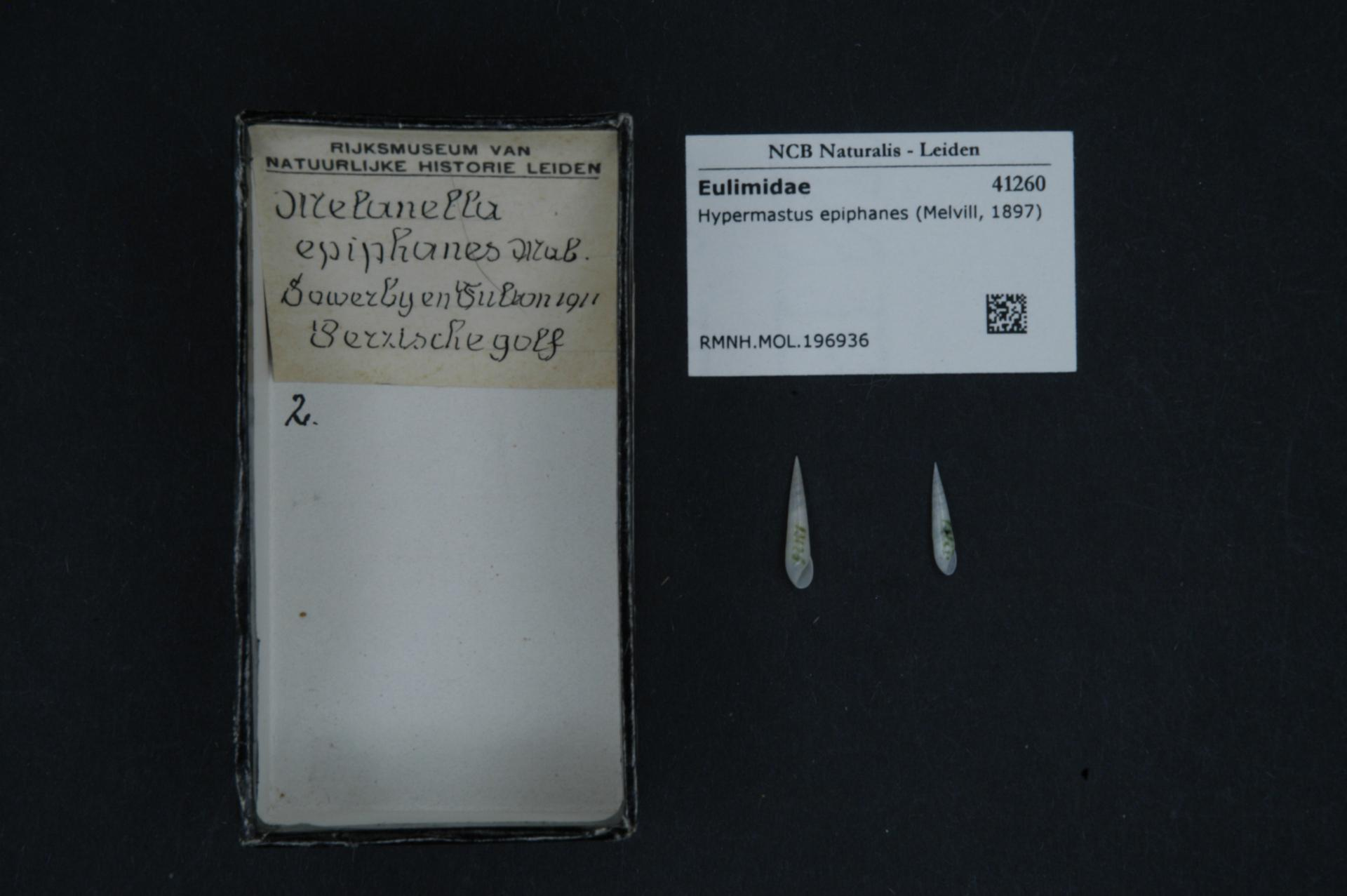
- Hypermastus epiphanes shells

Scientific classification
- Kingdom: Animalia
- Phylum: Mollusca
- Class: Gastropoda
- Subclass: Caenogastropoda
- Order: Littorinimorpha
- Family: Eulimidae
- Genus: Hypermastus
- Species: H. epiphanes

Binomial name
- Hypermastus epiphanes Melvill, 1897

Synonyms
- Eulima epiphanes Melvill, 1897

= Hypermastus epiphanes =

Species of gastropod

Hypermastus epiphanes is a species of sea snail, a marine gastropod mollusk in the family Eulimidae.
