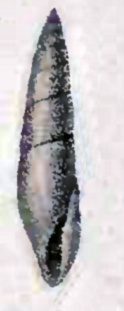

Scientific classification
- Kingdom: Animalia
- Phylum: Mollusca
- Class: Gastropoda
- Subclass: Caenogastropoda
- Order: Littorinimorpha
- Family: Eulimidae
- Genus: Hypermastus
- Species: H. philippianus

Binomial name
- Hypermastus philippianus (Dunker, 1860)

Synonyms
- Eulimella philippiana Dunker, 1860; Hypermastus dunkerianus Pilsbry, 1901

= Hypermastus philippianus =

Species of gastropod

Hypermastus philippianus is a species of sea snail, a marine gastropod mollusk in the family Eulimidae.
