= Granigyra typica =

Scientific classification
- Kingdom: Animalia
- Phylum: Mollusca
- Class: Gastropoda
- Subclass: Vetigastropoda
- Superfamily: Seguenzioidea
- Family: incertae sedis
- Genus: Granigyra
- Species: G. typica

Binomial name
- Granigyra typica Thiele, 1925

Synonyms
- Chunula typica Thiele, 1925

Species of gastropod

Granigyra typica is a species of sea snail, a marine gastropod mollusk, unassigned in the superfamily Seguenzioidea.
