= Lissotesta notalis =

Scientific classification
- Kingdom: Animalia
- Phylum: Mollusca
- Class: Gastropoda
- Subclass: Vetigastropoda
- Superfamily: Seguenzioidea
- Family: incertae sedis
- Genus: Lissotesta
- Species: L. notalis

Binomial name
- Lissotesta notalis (Strebel, 1908)

Synonyms
- Margarella notalis (Strebel, 1908); Margarita notalis Strebel, 1908 (original combination); Submargarita notalis (Strebel, 1908)

Species of gastropod

Lissotesta notalis is a species of sea snail, a marine gastropod mollusk, unassigned in the superfamily Seguenzioidea.

== Description ==
The height of the shell is 1.7 mm.

== Distribution ==
This marine species occurs off South Georgia at depths between 52 m and 100 m.
