= Hypermastus productus =

Scientific classification
- Kingdom: Animalia
- Phylum: Mollusca
- Class: Gastropoda
- Subclass: Caenogastropoda
- Order: Littorinimorpha
- Family: Eulimidae
- Genus: Hypermastus
- Species: H. productus

Binomial name
- Hypermastus productus G.B. Sowerby III, 1894

Synonyms
- Eulima producta G.B. Sowerby III, 1894

Species of gastropod

Hypermastus productus is a species of sea snail, a marine gastropod mollusk in the family Eulimidae.
