= Hypermastus araeosomae =

Scientific classification
- Kingdom: Animalia
- Phylum: Mollusca
- Class: Gastropoda
- Subclass: Caenogastropoda
- Order: Littorinimorpha
- Family: Eulimidae
- Genus: Hypermastus
- Species: H. araeosomae

Binomial name
- Hypermastus araeosomae Habe, 1992

Species of gastropod

Hypermastus araeosomae is a species of small sea snail, a marine gastropod mollusk in the family Eulimidae.
