= Granigyra piona =

Scientific classification
- Kingdom: Animalia
- Phylum: Mollusca
- Class: Gastropoda
- Subclass: Vetigastropoda
- Family: incertae sedis
- Genus: Granigyra
- Species: G. piona

Binomial name
- Granigyra piona (Dall, 1919)

Synonyms
- Ganesa piona Dall, 1919 (original combination)

Species of gastropod

Granigyra piona is a species of sea snail, a marine gastropod mollusk, unassigned in the superfamily Seguenzioidea.

== Description ==
The shell grows to a height of 2 mm.

== Distribution ==
This species occurs in the Pacific Ocean off the Galapagos Islands.
