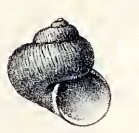
- Drawing with an apertural view of Anekes affinis

Scientific classification
- Kingdom: Animalia
- Phylum: Mollusca
- Class: Gastropoda
- Subclass: Vetigastropoda
- Superfamily: Seguenzioidea
- Genus: Anekes
- Species: A. affinis

Binomial name
- Anekes affinis (Jeffreys, 1883)

Synonyms
- Cyclostrema affine Jeffreys 1883 (original combination)

= Anekes affinis =

Species of gastropod

Anekes affinis is a species of sea snail, a marine gastropod mollusk, unranked in the superfamily Seguenzioidea.

== Description ==
The shell grows to a height of 1.5 mm. The rather thin, white shell is narrowly umbilicated. It is semitransparent glossy and lacks any sculpture, The four whorls are swollen and rapidly increasing. The periphery is simple and acute. The suture is narrow but deep.

== Distribution ==
This species occurs in the Mediterranean Sea
