= Lissotesta mammillata =

Scientific classification
- Kingdom: Animalia
- Phylum: Mollusca
- Class: Gastropoda
- Subclass: Vetigastropoda
- Family: incertae sedis
- Genus: Lissotesta
- Species: L. mammillata

Binomial name
- Lissotesta mammillata (Thiele, 1912)

Synonyms
- Submargarita mammillata Thiele, 1912 (original combination)

Species of gastropod

Lissotesta mammillata is a tiny species of sea snail, a marine gastropod mollusk, unassigned in the superfamily Seguenzioidea. It was first named and described by the German Zoologist Johannes Thiele.

== Description ==
The shell of Lissotesta mammillata is exceptionally small, reaching a recorded maximum height of 1.6mm at two teleoconch whorls. L. mammillata closely resembles Lissotesta wareni, however L. mammillata is distinguished by its larger shell size relative to its whorl count and it also has more crowded spiral threads on the base of its shell. Moreover Thiele's initial description mentioned no spiral threads above the periphery, but subsequent evaluations by malacological R.K Dell confirmed that these faint spiral threads above the periphery of its shell were evident upon closer structural illustration.

== Distribution ==
This marine species occurs off the Antarctic Peninsula.
