= Stilapex polaris =

- Shell of Stilapex polaris(holotype)

Scientific classification
- Kingdom: Animalia
- Phylum: Mollusca
- Class: Gastropoda
- Subclass: Caenogastropoda
- Order: Littorinimorpha
- Family: Eulimidae
- Genus: Stilapex
- Species: S. polaris

Binomial name
- Stilapex polaris (Hedley, 1916)

Synonyms
- Stilifer polaris Hedley, 1916 (superseded combination)

Species of gastropod

Stilapex polaris is a species of sea snail, a marine gastropod mollusk in the family Eulimidae.

== Description ==
The length of the shell attains 10 mm, its diamter 6 mm.

(Original description) The shell is conic-acuminate, thin, and translucent, with a gradate spire that tapers to an attenuate, mucronate apex. There are nine whorls, which are mostly flattened at the suture and rounded at the periphery; the body whorl is subglobose.

The shell is milk-white and has a very glossy surface. Narrow, faint spiral grooves are crossed by fine, radiating hair-like lines. The aperture is reniform; the columella is perpendicular, thickened, and reflected. The outer lip is thin-edged and sinuate anteriorly, while the anterior margin is rounded and slightly everted. There is no callus on the inner lip.

== Distribution ==
The marine species occurs in the contained in high seas of the Southern Ocean and off Antarctica.
