= Lissotesta radiata =

Scientific classification
- Kingdom: Animalia
- Phylum: Mollusca
- Class: Gastropoda
- Subclass: Vetigastropoda
- Superfamily: Seguenzioidea
- Family: incertae sedis
- Genus: Lissotesta
- Species: L. radiata

Binomial name
- Lissotesta radiata (Hedley, 1907)

Synonyms
- Omalalaxis radiata Hedley, 1907

Species of gastropod

Lissotesta radiata is a species of sea snail, a marine gastropod mollusk, unassigned in the superfamily Seguenzioidea.

== Distribution ==
This marine species occurs in the Great Barrier Reef, Australia.
