= Lissotesta micra =

Scientific classification
- Kingdom: Animalia
- Phylum: Mollusca
- Class: Gastropoda
- Subclass: Vetigastropoda
- Family: incertae sedis
- Genus: Lissotesta
- Species: L. micra

Binomial name
- Lissotesta micra (Tenison-Woods, 1876)

Synonyms
- Cyclostrema micra Tenison-Woods, 1876 (original combination)

Species of gastropod

Lissotesta micra, common name the tiny false top shell, is a species of sea snail, a marine gastropod mollusk, unassigned in the superfamily Seguenzioidea.

== Description ==
The shell grows to a height of 1.3 mm. Its shell is colourless (transparent) when fresh, and becomes opaque white with age.

== Distribution ==
This marine species occurs off Tasmania and off New South Wales, Australia.
