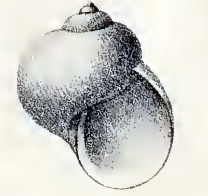
- Drawing with an apertural view of a shell of Granigyra pruinosa

Scientific classification
- Kingdom: Animalia
- Phylum: Mollusca
- Class: Gastropoda
- Subclass: Vetigastropoda
- Superfamily: Seguenzioidea
- Family: incertae sedis
- Genus: Granigyra; Dall, 1889

Type species
- Cyclostrema limatum Dall, 1889

Synonyms
- Chunula Thiele, 1925; Cyclostrema (Granigyra) Dall, 1889

= Granigyra =

Genus of gastropods

Granigyra is a genus of sea snails, marine gastropod mollusks, unassigned in the superfamily Seguenzioidea.

== Species ==
Species within the genus Granigyra include:

- Granigyra arenosa Warén, 1993
- Granigyra filosa (Dall, 1919)
- Granigyra granulifera Warén, 1992
- Granigyra inflata (Warén, 1992)
- Granigyra limata (Dall, 1889)
- Granigyra nipponica (Okutani, 1964)
- Granigyra oblatogyra De Souza & Pimenta, 2002
- Granigyra piona (Dall, 1919)
- Granigyra pruinosa (Jeffreys, 1883)
- Granigyra radiata Dall, 1927
- Granigyra spinulosa Bush, 1897
- Granigyra tenera (Jeffreys, 1883)
- Granigyra typica Thiele, 1925

Species brought into synonymy

- Granigyra monterosatoi (van Aartsen & Bogi, 1986): synonym of Rugulina monterosatoi (van Aartsen & Bogi, 1986)
