= Lissotesta japonica =

Scientific classification
- Kingdom: Animalia
- Phylum: Mollusca
- Class: Gastropoda
- Subclass: Vetigastropoda
- Superfamily: Seguenzioidea
- Family: incertae sedis
- Genus: Lissotesta
- Species: L. japonica

Binomial name
- Lissotesta japonica (A. Adams, 1861)

Synonyms
- Adeorbis japonicus A. Adams, 1861

Species of gastropod

Lissotesta japonica is a species of sea snail, a marine gastropod mollusk, unassigned in the superfamily Seguenzioidea.
