= Lissotesta scalaroides =

Scientific classification
- Kingdom: Animalia
- Phylum: Mollusca
- Class: Gastropoda
- Subclass: Vetigastropoda
- Superfamily: Seguenzioidea
- Family: incertae sedis
- Genus: Lissotesta
- Species: L. scalaroides

Binomial name
- Lissotesta scalaroides Rubio & Rolán, 2013

Species of gastropod

Lissotesta scalaroides is a species of sea snail, a marine gastropod mollusk, unassigned in the superfamily Seguenzioidea.
