= Lissotesta similis =

Scientific classification
- Kingdom: Animalia
- Phylum: Mollusca
- Class: Gastropoda
- Subclass: Vetigastropoda
- Family: incertae sedis
- Genus: Lissotesta
- Species: L. similis

Binomial name
- Lissotesta similis (Thiele, 1912)

Synonyms
- Submargarita similis Thiele, 1912 (original combination); Intortia homocostata Egorova, 1972

Species of gastropod

Lissotesta similis is a species of sea snail, a marine gastropod mollusk, unassigned in the superfamily Seguenzioidea.

== Description ==
The shells contains a narrow umbilicus and a high but variable amount of spiral threads. It is very close to liratula.

== Distribution ==
This species occurs in Antarctic waters, likely with a wide distribution. It was first found at Gauss Station in the Davis Sea. Specimens have also been collected in the Bransfield Strait and the Weddell Sea.
