= Lissotesta =

Lissotesta Temporal range: Miocene to Recent

Scientific classification
- Kingdom: Animalia
- Phylum: Mollusca
- Class: Gastropoda
- Subclass: Vetigastropoda
- Superfamily: Seguenzioidea
- Family: incertae sedis
- Genus: Lissotesta; Iredale, 1915

Type species
- Cyclostrema micra J. E. Tenison-Woods, 1877

Synonyms
- Intortia Egorova, 1972; Lapidicola Egorova, 1972; Submargarita Strebel, 1908

Genus of gastropods

Lissotesta is a genus of minute sea snails or micromolluscs, marine gastropod molluscs, unassigned in the superfamily Seguenzioidea.

== Species ==
Species within the genus Lissotesta include:

- Lissotesta ambigua Dell, 1956
- Lissotesta arenosa Laseron, 1954
- Lissotesta aupouria Powell, 1937
- Lissotesta benthicola Powell, 1927
- †Lissotesta beta Laws, 1939
- Lissotesta bicarinata Powell, 1940
- Lissotesta conoidea Powell, 1937
- Lissotesta decipiens Powell, 1940
- Lissotesta errata Finlay, 1927
- †Lissotesta exigua (Suter, 1917)
- Lissotesta gittenbergeri (van Aartsen & Bogi, 1988)
- Lissotesta granum (Murdoch and Suter, 1906
- Lissotesta impervia (Strebel, 1908)
- Lissotesta inscripta (Tate, 1899)
- Lissotesta japonica (A. Adams, 1861)
- Lissotesta liratula (Pelseneer, 1903)
- Lissotesta macknighti (Dell, 1990)
- Lissotesta major Warén, 1992
- Lissotesta mammillata (Thiele, 1912)
- Lissotesta micra (Tenison-Woods, 1876)
- Lissotesta minima (Seguenza, 1876)
- Lissotesta minutissima (E. A. Smith, 1907)
- Lissotesta notalis (Strebel, 1908)
- Lissotesta oblata Powell, 1940
- Lissotesta otagoensis Dell, 1956
- †Lissotesta pygmaea Lozouet, 1999
- Lissotesta radiata (Hedley, 1907)
- Lissotesta scalaroides Rubio & Rolán, 2013
- Lissotesta similis (Thiele, 1912)
- Lissotesta strebeli (Thiele, 1912)
- Lissotesta studeri (Thiele, 1912)
- Lissotesta turrita (Gaglini, 1987)
- Lissotesta unifilosa (Thiele, 1912)
- †Lissotesta virodunensis Lozouet, 1999

Nomen dubium

- Lissotesta humilis (Pelseneer, 1903)
