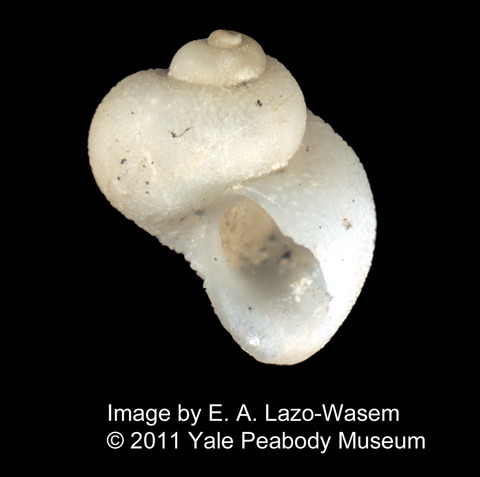

Scientific classification
- Kingdom: Animalia
- Phylum: Mollusca
- Class: Gastropoda
- Subclass: Vetigastropoda
- Family: incertae sedis
- Genus: Granigyra
- Species: G. limata

Binomial name
- Granigyra limata (Dall, 1889)

Synonyms
- Cyclostrema limatum Dall, 1889 (basionym); Ganesa limata (Dall, 1889)

= Granigyra limata =

Species of gastropod

Granigyra limata is a species of sea snail, a marine gastropod mollusk, unassigned in the superfamily Seguenzioidea.

== Description ==
(Original description by W.H. Dall) The size of the shell varies between 2 mm and 2.5 mm. The small, white shell has almost exactly the shape of Trochus fulgidus Jeffreys, but a little smaller, with three extremely rounded whorls covered with small close-set irregular granulations of nearly uniform size like sand grains. The base of the shell has a small perforate umbilicus, into which the whorl rounds without carina, callus, or break of any kind. The circular aperture has thin, sharp, uniform, not reflected margins. This singular little shell has the typical characteristics of a Cyclostrema in its conchological features, except for its granular surface.

== Distribution ==
This species occurs in the Gulf of Mexico and in the Atlantic Ocean off Georgia, US.
