= Hypermastus echinocardiophilus =

Scientific classification
- Kingdom: Animalia
- Phylum: Mollusca
- Class: Gastropoda
- Subclass: Caenogastropoda
- Order: Littorinimorpha
- Family: Eulimidae
- Genus: Hypermastus
- Species: H. echinocardiophilus

Binomial name
- Hypermastus echinocardiophilus (Habe, 1976)

Synonyms
- Curveulima echinocardiaphila Habe, 1976

Species of gastropod

Hypermastus echinocardiophilus is a species of sea snail, a marine gastropod mollusk in the family Eulimidae.
