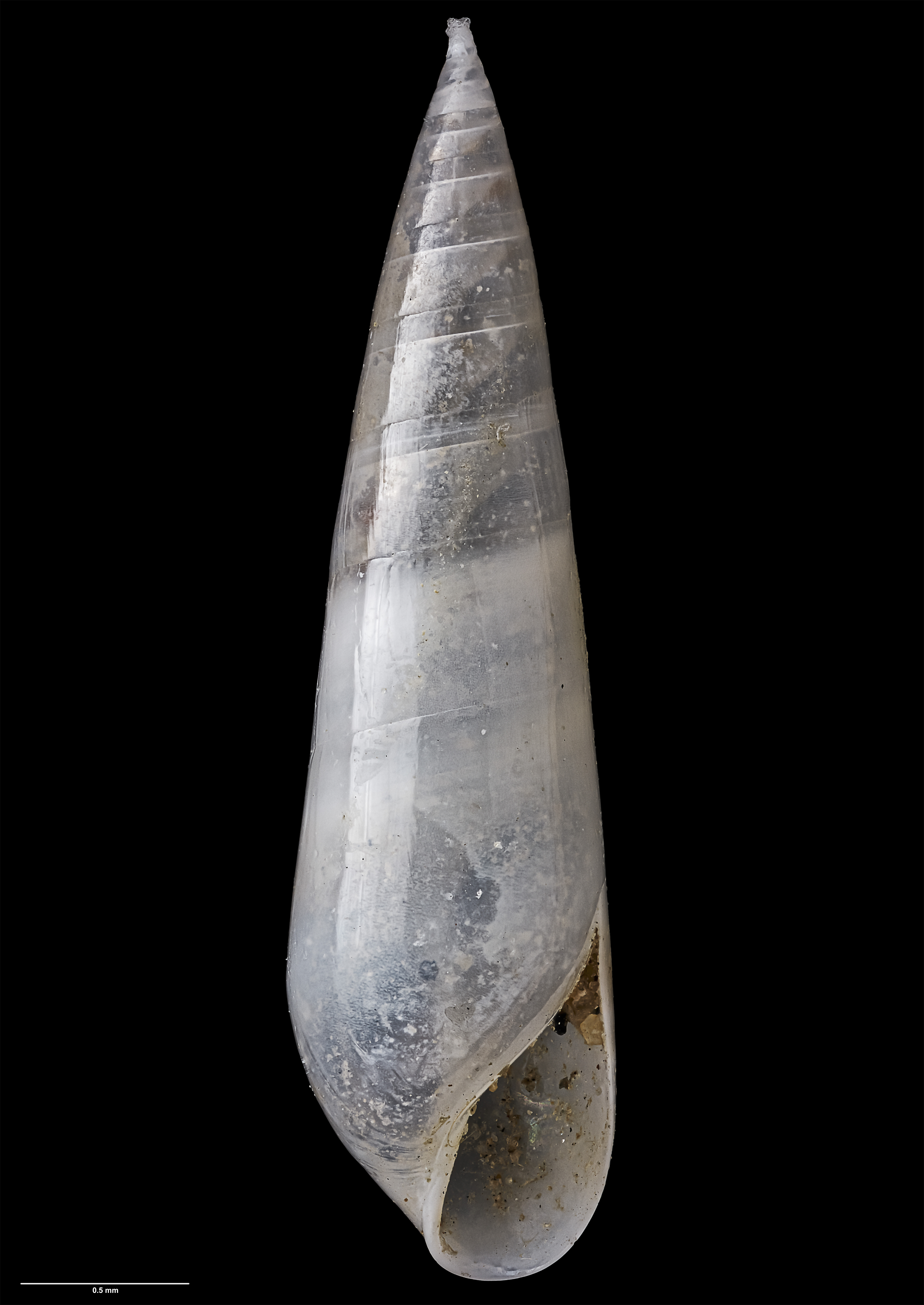
- Holotype of Hypermastus bulbulus

Scientific classification
- Kingdom: Animalia
- Phylum: Mollusca
- Class: Gastropoda
- Subclass: Caenogastropoda
- Order: Littorinimorpha
- Family: Eulimidae
- Genus: Hypermastus
- Species: H. bulbulus

Binomial name
- Hypermastus bulbulus (Murdoch & Suter, 1906)

Synonyms
- Balcis pervegrandis Powell, 1940; Eulima bulbula Murdoch & Suter, 1906 (original combination)

= Hypermastus bulbulus =

Species of gastropod

Hypermastus bulbulus is a species of sea snail, a marine gastropod mollusk in the family Eulimidae.

== Distribution ==
This marine species is endemic to New Zealand.
