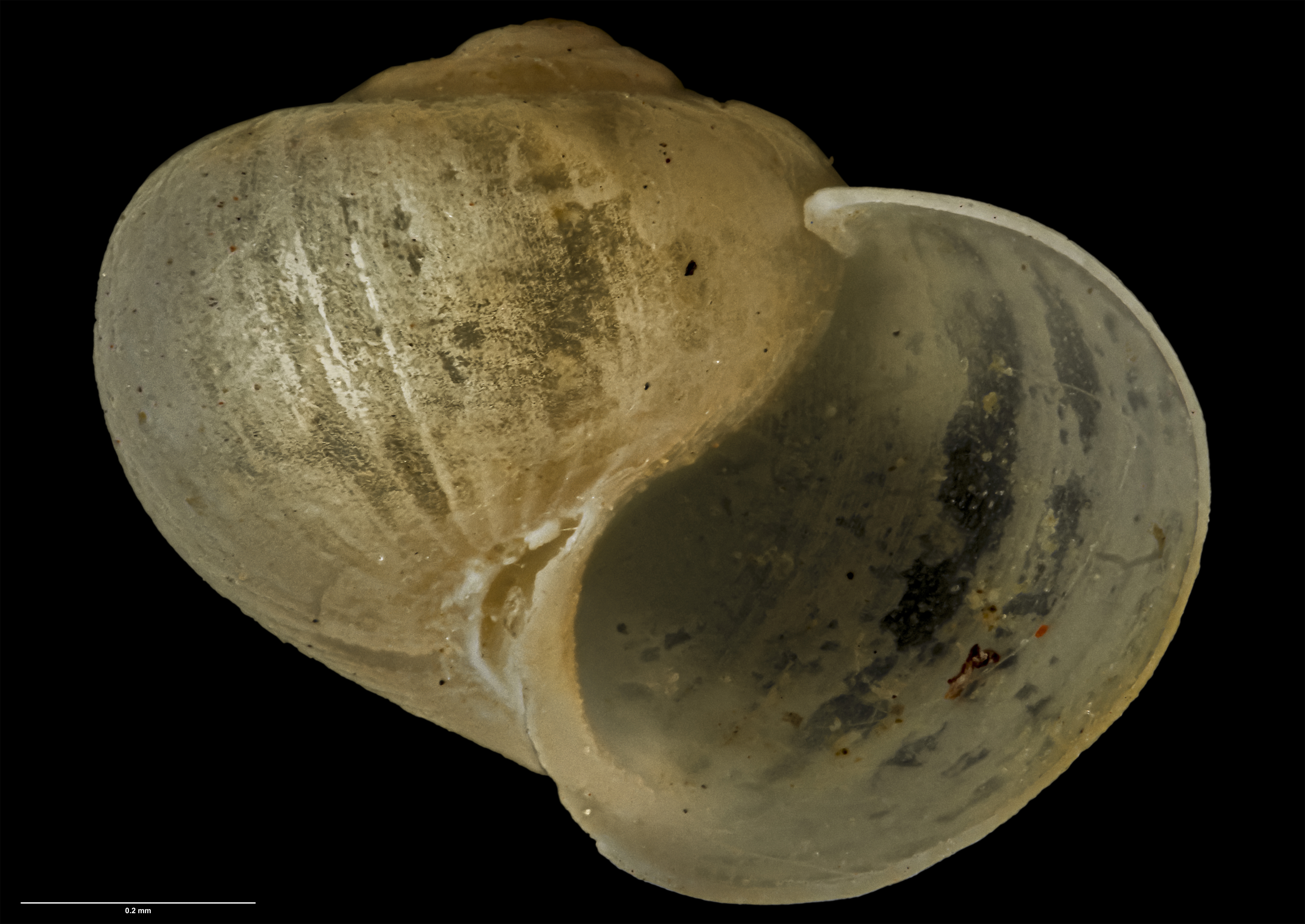

Scientific classification
- Kingdom: Animalia
- Phylum: Mollusca
- Class: Gastropoda
- Subclass: Vetigastropoda
- Family: incertae sedis
- Genus: Lissotesta
- Species: L. oblata

Binomial name
- Lissotesta oblata Powell, 1937

= Lissotesta oblata =

Species of gastropod

Lissotesta oblata is a species of small sea snail, a marine gastropod mollusc, unassigned in the superfamily Seguenzioidea.

== Distribution ==
This marine species occurs off New Zealand.
