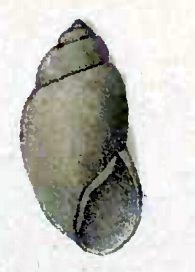
- Drawing of a shell of Stilapex montrouzieri

Scientific classification
- Kingdom: Animalia
- Phylum: Mollusca
- Class: Gastropoda
- Subclass: Caenogastropoda
- Order: Littorinimorpha
- Family: Eulimidae
- Genus: Stilapex; Iredale, 1925

Type species
- Stilapex lactarius Iredale, 1925

Synonyms
- Lambertia Souverbie, 1869 (Invalid: junior homonym of Lambertia Robineau-Desvoidy, 1863 [Diptera]); Stilapex laseroni Cotton, 1957

= Stilapex =

Genus of gastropods

Stilapex is a genus of very small parasitic sea snails, marine gastropod mollusks or micromollusks in the family Eulimidae.

== Species ==
Species within the genera Stilapex include:

- Stilapex cookeanus Bartsch, 1917
- Stilapex eburnea Schepman & Nierstrasz, 1909
- Stilapex lactarius Iredale, 1925 (Type taxon)
- Stilapex montrouzieri Souverbie, 1869
- Stilapex ophiuraphila Habe, 1976
- Stilapex parva Schepman, 1909
- Stilapex polaris Hedley, 1916
- Stilapex suzuki Habe, 1991
- Stilapex teremachii Habe, 1958
- Stilapex thielei Sturany, 1903
- Stilapex zebra Habe, 1976

Species brought into synonymy

- Stilapex cookeana [sic] : synonym of Stilapex cookeanus (Bartsch, 1917)
- Stilapex koyamai Habe, 1976 : synonym of Peasistilifer koyamai (Habe, 1976)
- Stilapex laseroni Cotton, 1957 : synonym of Stilapex parva (Schepman, 1909)
- Stilapex tokii Habe, 1974: synonym of Echinothuricola tokii (Habe, 1974)
