= Granigyra oblatogyra =

Scientific classification
- Kingdom: Animalia
- Phylum: Mollusca
- Class: Gastropoda
- Subclass: Vetigastropoda
- Family: incertae sedis
- Genus: Granigyra
- Species: G. oblatogyra

Binomial name
- Granigyra oblatogyra De Souza & Pimenta, 2002

Species of gastropod

Granigyra oblatogyra is a species of sea snail, a marine gastropod mollusk, unassigned in the superfamily Seguenzioidea.

== Description ==
The shell grows to a height of 2.5 mm.

== Distribution ==
This species occurs in the Atlantic Ocean off Brazil at depths between 500 m and 1,250 m.
