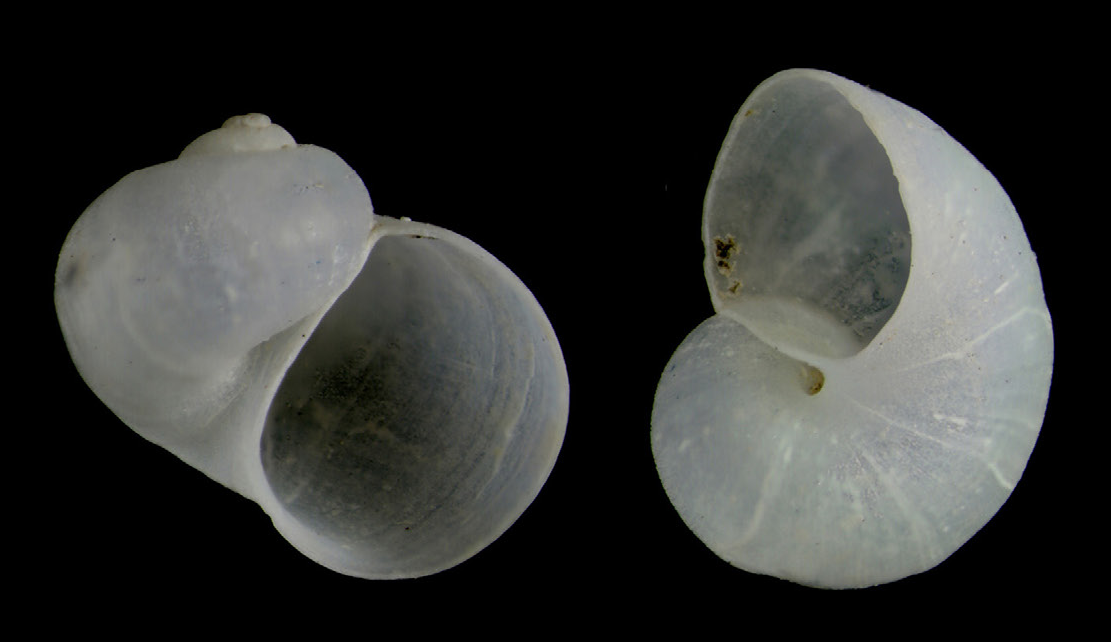
- Shell of Granigyra pruinosa

Scientific classification
- Kingdom: Animalia
- Phylum: Mollusca
- Class: Gastropoda
- Subclass: Vetigastropoda
- Family: incertae sedis
- Genus: Granigyra
- Species: G. pruinosa

Binomial name
- Granigyra pruinosa (Jeffreys, 1883)

Synonyms
- Ganesa pruinosa Jeffreys 1883 (original combination)

= Granigyra pruinosa =

Species of gastropod

Granigyra pruinosa is a species of sea snail, a marine gastropod mollusk, unassigned in the superfamily Seguenzioidea.

== Description ==
The size of the shell varies between 2.5 mm and 6.2 mm. The small, semitransparent shell is narrowly rimate. It is frosted by minute numerous white tubercles, which are partly embedded in the substance of the shell,. On one specimen there are slight spiral lines below the deep suture. The four whorls are swollen and rapidly increasing in size.

== Distribution ==
This species occurs in European waters off Ireland, the Bay of Biscay and Portugal.
