= Hypermastus acutus =

Scientific classification
- Kingdom: Animalia
- Phylum: Mollusca
- Class: Gastropoda
- Subclass: Caenogastropoda
- Order: Littorinimorpha
- Family: Eulimidae
- Genus: Hypermastus
- Species: H. acutus

Binomial name
- Hypermastus acutus (G. B. Sowerby I, 1834)

Synonyms
- Balcis acuta (G. B. Sowerby I, 1834); Eulima acuta A. Adams, 1851; Melanella acuta (G. B. Sowerby I, 1834)

Species of gastropod

Hypermastus acutus is a species of sea snail, a marine gastropod mollusk in the family Eulimidae.

== Distribution ==
This species occurs in the Red Sea.
