= Lissotesta strebeli =

Scientific classification
- Kingdom: Animalia
- Phylum: Mollusca
- Class: Gastropoda
- Subclass: Vetigastropoda
- Family: incertae sedis
- Genus: Lissotesta
- Species: L. strebeli

Binomial name
- Lissotesta strebeli (Thiele, 1912)

Synonyms
- Submargarita strebeli Thiele, 1912 (original combination)

Species of gastropod

Lissotesta strebeli is a species of sea snail, a marine gastropod mollusk, unassigned in the superfamily Seguenzioidea.

== Description ==
The shell grows to a height of 2.2 mm. It is characterized by a smooth shell.

== Distribution ==
This species occurs off the South Shetland Islands at depths between 220 m and 311 m. It has also been found in the Weddell Sea and was originally found near Gauss station in the Davis Sea. It is relatively common within its genus.
