= Hypermastus cylindricus =

Scientific classification
- Kingdom: Animalia
- Phylum: Mollusca
- Class: Gastropoda
- Subclass: Caenogastropoda
- Order: Littorinimorpha
- Family: Eulimidae
- Genus: Hypermastus
- Species: H. cylindricus

Binomial name
- Hypermastus cylindricus G.B. Sowerby III, 1900

Synonyms
- Mucronalia cylindricus G.B. Sowerby III, 1900

Species of gastropod

Hypermastus cylindricus is a species of sea snail, a marine gastropod mollusk in the family Eulimidae.
