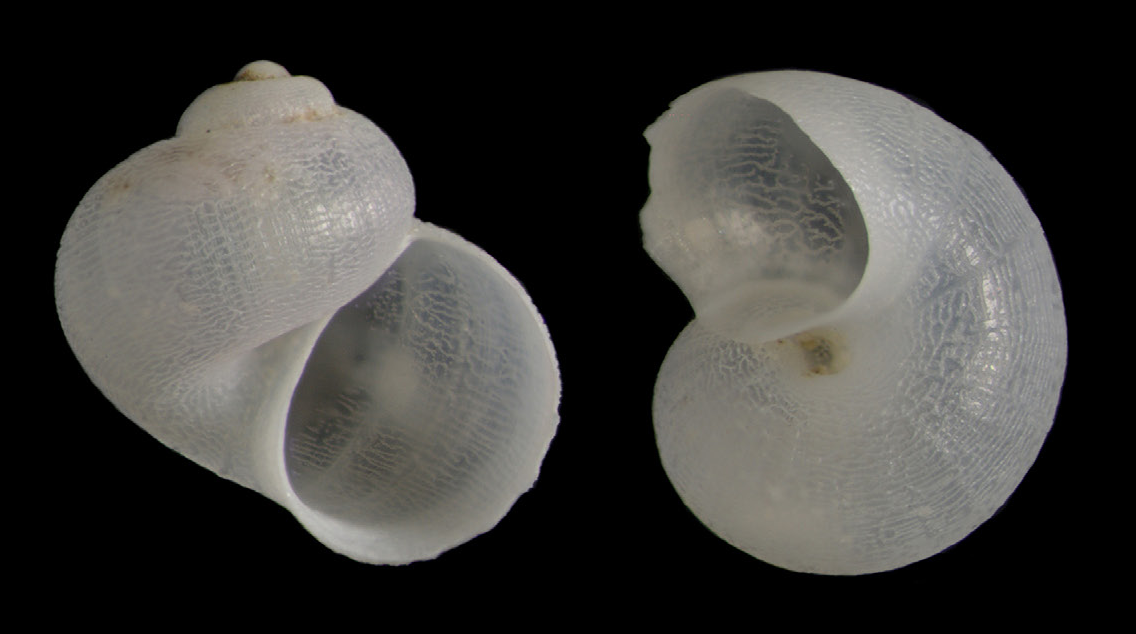

Scientific classification
- Kingdom: Animalia
- Phylum: Mollusca
- Class: Gastropoda
- Subclass: Vetigastropoda
- Family: incertae sedis
- Genus: Granigyra
- Species: G. inflata

Binomial name
- Granigyra inflata (Warén, 1992)

Synonyms
- Anekes inflata Warén, 1992; Cyclostrema bithynoides Jeffreys 1883 (preoccupied by Cyclostrema bythinoides Monterosato, 1890); Skenea bithynoides (Jeffreys, J.G., 1883)

= Granigyra inflata =

Species of gastropod

Granigyra inflata is a species of sea snail in the superfamily Seguenzioidea.

== Description ==
The size of the shell varies between 1 and 2 mm (0.039 and 0.079 in).

== Distribution ==
This species occurs in the Atlantic Ocean off Spain, Portugal, and Iceland Reykjanes Ridge.

== Sources ==
- Jeffreys J. G., 1878–1885: On the mollusca procured during the H. M. S. "Lightning" and "Porcupine" expedition; Proceedings of the Zoological Society of London; Part 1 (1878): 393–416 pl. 22–23. Part 2 (1879): 553–588 pl. 45–46 [October 1879]. Part 3 (1881): 693–724 pl. 61. Part 4 (1881): 922–952 pl. 70–71 [1882]. Part 5 (1882): 656–687 pl. 49–50 [1883]. Part 6 (1883): 88–115 pl. 19–20. Part 7 (1884): 111–149 pl. 9–10. Part 8 (1884): 341–372 pl. 26–28. Part 9 (1885): 27–63 pl. 4–6
