= Granigyra filosa =

Scientific classification
- Kingdom: Animalia
- Phylum: Mollusca
- Class: Gastropoda
- Subclass: Vetigastropoda
- Superfamily: Seguenzioidea
- Family: incertae sedis
- Genus: Granigyra
- Species: G. filosa

Binomial name
- Granigyra filosa (Dall, 1919)

Species of gastropod

Granigyra filosa is a species of sea snail, a marine gastropod mollusk, unassigned in the superfamily Seguenzioidea.

== Description ==
The shell grows to a height of 2.3 mm.

== Distribution ==
Thios species occurs in the Pacific Ocean off the Galapagos Islands.
