= Hypermastus williamsi =

Scientific classification
- Kingdom: Animalia
- Phylum: Mollusca
- Class: Gastropoda
- Subclass: Caenogastropoda
- Order: Littorinimorpha
- Family: Eulimidae
- Genus: Hypermastus
- Species: H. williamsi

Binomial name
- Hypermastus williamsi Cotton & Godfrey, 1932

Synonyms
- Strombiformis williamsi Cotton & Godfrey, 1932.

Species of gastropod

Hypermastus Williamsi is a species of sea snail, a marine gastropod mollusk in the family Eulimidae.
