= Hypermastus casta =

Scientific classification
- Kingdom: Animalia
- Phylum: Mollusca
- Class: Gastropoda
- Subclass: Caenogastropoda
- Order: Littorinimorpha
- Family: Eulimidae
- Genus: Hypermastus
- Species: H. casta

Binomial name
- Hypermastus casta A. Adams, 1861

Synonyms
- Leiostraca casta A. Adams, 1861; Leiostraca constantia A. Adams, 1861; Leiostraca maria A. Adams, 1861

Species of gastropod

Hypermastus casta is a species of sea snail, a marine gastropod mollusk in the family Eulimidae.
