= Lissotesta pygmaea =

Scientific classification
- Kingdom: Animalia
- Phylum: Mollusca
- Class: Gastropoda
- Subclass: Vetigastropoda
- Superfamily: Seguenzioidea
- Family: incertae sedis
- Genus: Lissotesta
- Species: †L. pygmaea

Binomial name
- †Lissotesta pygmaea Lozouet, 1999

Extinct species of gastropod

Lissotesta pygmaea is an extinct species of sea snail, a marine gastropod mollusk, unassigned in the superfamily Seguenzioidea.

== Distribution ==
This species occurs in France.
