= Lissotesta granum =

Scientific classification
- Kingdom: Animalia
- Phylum: Mollusca
- Class: Gastropoda
- Subclass: Vetigastropoda
- Family: incertae sedis
- Genus: Lissotesta
- Species: L. granum

Binomial name
- Lissotesta granum (Murdoch and Suter, 1906

Synonyms
- Cirsonella granum Murdoch and Suter, 1906

Species of gastropod

Lissotesta granum is a species of small sea snail, a marine gastropod mollusc, unassigned in the superfamily Seguenzioidea.

== Distribution ==
This marine species occurs off New Zealand.
