= Lissotesta bicarinata =

Scientific classification
- Kingdom: Animalia
- Phylum: Mollusca
- Class: Gastropoda
- Subclass: Vetigastropoda
- Family: incertae sedis
- Genus: Lissotesta
- Species: L. bicarinata

Binomial name
- Lissotesta bicarinata Powell, 1940

Species of gastropod

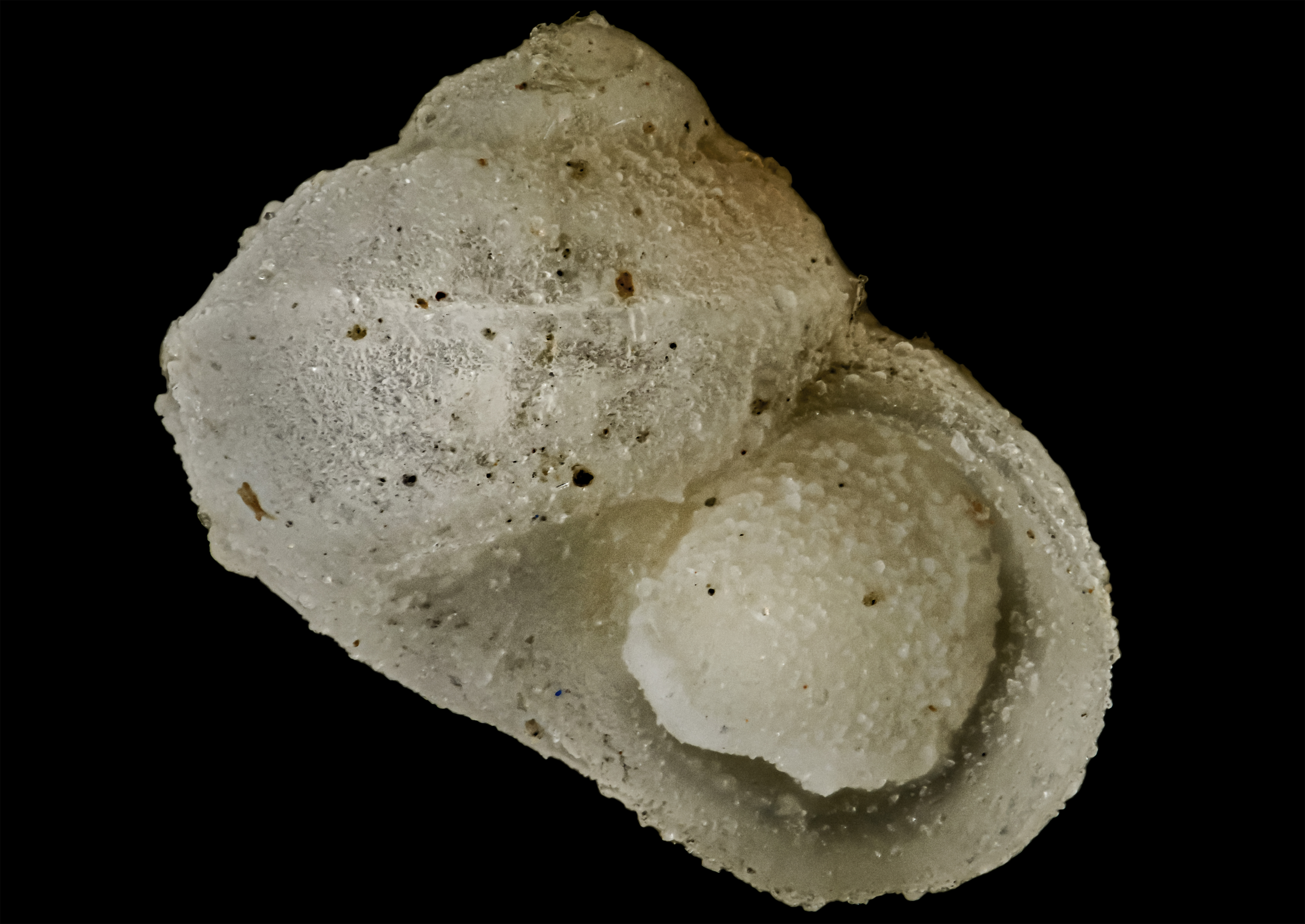
Preserved specimen of Lissotesta bicarinata Powell.

Lissotesta bicarinata is a species of very minute sea snail, a marine gastropod mollusc, unassigned in the superfamily Seguenzioidea.

== Distribution ==
This marine species occurs off New Zealand.
