= Granigyra radiata =

Scientific classification
- Kingdom: Animalia
- Phylum: Mollusca
- Class: Gastropoda
- Subclass: Vetigastropoda
- Family: incertae sedis
- Genus: Granigyra
- Species: G. radiata

Binomial name
- Granigyra radiata Dall, 1927

Synonyms
- Ganesa radiata (Dall, 1927)

Species of gastropod

Granigyra radiata is a species of sea snail, a marine gastropod mollusk, unassigned in the superfamily Seguenzioidea.

== Description ==
The shell grows to a height of 2.5 mm.

== Distribution ==
This species occurs in the Atlantic Ocean off Georgia, United States, found at a depth of 538 m.
