= Hypermastus peronellicola =

Scientific classification
- Kingdom: Animalia
- Phylum: Mollusca
- Class: Gastropoda
- Subclass: Caenogastropoda
- Order: Littorinimorpha
- Family: Eulimidae
- Genus: Hypermastus
- Species: H. peronellicola

Binomial name
- Hypermastus peronellicola Kuroda & Habe, 1950

Synonyms
- Balcis peronellicola Kuroda & Habe, 1950

Species of gastropod

Hypermastus peronellicola is a species of sea snail, a marine gastropod mollusk in the family Eulimidae.
