= Lissotesta inscripta =

Scientific classification
- Domain: Eukaryota
- Kingdom: Animalia
- Phylum: Mollusca
- Class: Gastropoda
- Subclass: Vetigastropoda
- Superfamily: Seguenzioidea
- Family: incertae sedis
- Genus: Lissotesta
- Species: L. inscripta

Binomial name
- Lissotesta inscripta (Tate, 1899)

Species of gastropod

Lissotesta inscripta is a species of sea snail, a marine gastropod mollusk, unassigned in the superfamily Seguenzioidea.
