= Hypermastus indistinctus =

Scientific classification
- Kingdom: Animalia
- Phylum: Mollusca
- Class: Gastropoda
- Subclass: Caenogastropoda
- Order: Littorinimorpha
- Family: Eulimidae
- Genus: Hypermastus
- Species: H. indistinctus

Binomial name
- Hypermastus indistinctus Thiele, 1925

Synonyms
- Eulima indistincta Thiele, 1925

Species of gastropod

Hypermastus indistinctus is a species of sea snail, a marine gastropod mollusk in the family Eulimidae.
