= Lissotesta minutissima =

Scientific classification
- Kingdom: Animalia
- Phylum: Mollusca
- Class: Gastropoda
- Subclass: Vetigastropoda
- Family: incertae sedis
- Genus: Lissotesta
- Species: L. minutissima

Binomial name
- Lissotesta minutissima (E. A. Smith, 1907)

Synonyms
- Valvatella minutissima E. A. Smith, 1907 (original combination)

Species of gastropod

Lissotesta minutissima is a species of sea snail, a marine gastropod mollusk, unassigned in the superfamily Seguenzioidea.

== Distribution ==
This species occurs in the Ross Sea, Antarctica.
