= Stilapex cookeanus =

- Shell of Stilapex cookeanus(original image)

Scientific classification
- Kingdom: Animalia
- Phylum: Mollusca
- Class: Gastropoda
- Subclass: Caenogastropoda
- Order: Littorinimorpha
- Family: Eulimidae
- Genus: Stilapex
- Species: S. cookeanus

Binomial name
- Stilapex cookeanus (Bartsch, 1917)

Synonyms
- Hypermastus cookeanus (Bartsch, 1917); Lambertia cookeana Bartsch, 1917 (original combination); Stilapex cookeana [sic] (incorrect gender ending)

Species of gastropod

Stilapex cookeanus is a species of sea snail, a marine gastropod mollusk in the family Eulimidae.

== Description ==
The length of the shell attains 3.7 mm, its diamter 2 mm.

(Original description) The shell is ovate, with a narrow, cylindric protoconch consisting of two whorls. Following these two whorls, the subsequent whorls become decidedly gibbose and are appressed at the summit.

The surface of the whorls is marked by exceedingly retractive lines of growth and by very fine, microscopic spiral striae. The periphery of the body whorl is well rounded. The base is moderately long, stout, curved, and reflected; the parietal wall is covered by a thick callus.

== Distribution ==
The marine species occurs off Baja California, Mexico and Ecuador.
