= Lissotesta gittenbergeri =

Scientific classification
- Kingdom: Animalia
- Phylum: Mollusca
- Class: Gastropoda
- Subclass: Vetigastropoda
- Family: incertae sedis
- Genus: Lissotesta
- Species: L. gittenbergeri

Binomial name
- Lissotesta gittenbergeri (van Aartsen & Bogi, 1988)

Synonyms
- Anekes gittenbergeri van Aartsen & Bogi 1988 (original combination)

Species of gastropod

Lissotesta gittenbergeri is a species of sea snail, a marine gastropod mollusk, unassigned in the superfamily Seguenzioidea.

== Description ==
The shell grows to a height of 0.7 mm.

== Distribution ==
This species occurs in the Mediterranean Sea, in the Atlantic Ocean off Madeira and off Lusitanian seamounts.
