= Melanella tanabensis =

Scientific classification
- Kingdom: Animalia
- Phylum: Mollusca
- Class: Gastropoda
- Subclass: Caenogastropoda
- Order: Littorinimorpha
- Family: Eulimidae
- Genus: Melanella
- Species: M. tanabensis

Binomial name
- Melanella tanabensis Takano, Ha. Tanaka & Kano, 2019

Synonyms
- Hypermastus lacteus (A. Adams, 1863); Leiostraca (Mucronalia) lactea A. Adams, 1863 (original combination); Mucronalia lactea (A. Adams, 1863)

Species of gastropod

Melanella tanabensis is a species of sea snail, a marine gastropod mollusk in the family Eulimidae. The species is one of many species known to exist within the genus, Melanella.

== Description ==
(Original description in Latin) The shell is awl-shaped and pupoid, with a blunt apex and a small, short point. It is milky-white and scarcely opaque. The shell consists of four regular, flat whorls, separated by impressed sutures. The aperture is oblique and oblong, widening and extending towards the front.

== Distribution ==
The holotype of this species was found off Japan.
