= Lissotesta turrita =

Scientific classification
- Domain: Eukaryota
- Kingdom: Animalia
- Phylum: Mollusca
- Class: Gastropoda
- Subclass: Vetigastropoda
- Family: incertae sedis
- Genus: Lissotesta
- Species: L. turrita

Binomial name
- Lissotesta turrita (Gaglini, 1987)

Synonyms
- Anekes nofronii van Aartsen & Bogi 1988; Cyclostrema turritum Gaglini 1987; Margarita miliaris Seguenza, G., 1876 (dubious synonym)

Species of gastropod

Lissotesta turrita is a species of sea snail, a marine gastropod mollusk, unassigned in the superfamily Seguenzioidea.

== Description ==
The shell grows to a height of 0.7 mm.

== Distribution ==
This species occurs in the Alboran Sea; in the Atlantic Ocean off Norway and Madeira.
