= Anders Herman Warén =

Swedish zoologist and malacologist

- Born: 1945 (age 80–81)
- Education: University of Gothenburg
- Known for: Research on deep-sea molluscs and Eulimidae
- Scientific career
- Fields: Zoology, malacology
- Workplaces: University of Gothenburg; Swedish Museum of Natural History

Anders Herman Warén (born 1945) is a Swedish zoologist and malacologist specializing in invertebrates, particularly molluscs of the family Eulimidae.

== Biography ==
Warén holds a doctorate in biology from the University of Gothenburg. He was a research assistant in the university's Department of Zoology from 1979 to 1984 and subsequently became the first curator of the Department of Invertebrates at the Swedish Museum of Natural History in Stockholm. His research has focused on the fauna of deep-sea molluscs, shelled molluscs of the North Atlantic, and molluscs associated with chemosynthetic environments.

He has participated in numerous marine expeditions around the world, including expeditions in the tropical seas of the Pacific Ocean. His work on tropical eastern Pacific eulimid gastropods included the publication Comments on and descriptions of eulimid gastropods from tropical west America in The Veliger in 1992.

Warén has described and named several hundred species of molluscs new to science. He also described the family Ebalidae in connection with his work on the systematic position and validity of the genus Ebala. The taxon is now treated as the subfamily Ebalinae.

The author abbreviation Warén is used to identify Anders Herman Warén as the author of scientific names in zoological nomenclature.
