= Mucronalia =

Scientific classification
- Kingdom: Animalia
- Phylum: Mollusca
- Class: Gastropoda
- Subclass: Caenogastropoda
- Order: Littorinimorpha
- Family: Eulimidae
- Genus: Mucronalia; A. Adams, 1860

Type species
- Mucronalia bicincta A. Adams, 1860

Synonyms
- Eulima (Mucronalia) A. Adams, 1860 superseded rank; Leiostraca (Mucronalia) A. Adams, 1860 superseded rank; Mucronella A. W. Ivanov, 1973 (misspelling of Mucronalia)

Genus of gastropods

Mucronalia is a genus of very small parasitic sea snails, marine gastropod mollusks or micromollusks in the family Eulimidae.

This genus was first described in 1860 by Arthur Adams in his paper, "On some new genera and species of Mollusca from Japan".

These sea snails are thought to be parasitic on ophiuroids (brittle stars).

== Species ==
Species within the genera Mucronalia include:

- Mucronalia alba Takano, Ha. Tanaka & Kano, 2019
- Mucronalia bicincta A. Adams, 1860 (Type taxon)
- Mucronalia bizonula Melvill, 1906
- Mucronalia bulimuloides Dall, 1927
- Mucronalia exilis A. Adams, 1862
- Mucronalia exquisita G. B. Sowerby III, 1915
- Mucronalia involuta Carpenter, 1865
- Mucronalia lepida Melvill, 1906
- Mucronalia mammillata Dall, 1927
- Mucronalia oxytenes Melvill, 1904
- Mucronalia pinguicula Ortega & Gofas, 2019
- † Mucronalia propinqua (Cossmann, 1888)
- Mucronalia rosea Pease, 1860
- Mucronalia ryukyuensis Takano, Kubo & Oguchi, 2022
- Mucronalia trilineata Warén, 1980

Taxon inquirendum

- Mucronalia interrupta (A. Adams, 1864)

Nomen nudum

- Mucronalia tumida ^{Pease MS, Tryon, 1886}

Species brought into synonymy

- Mucronalia aethria Melvill, 1918: synonym of Melanella aethria (Melvill, 1918)
- Mucronalia angulata Mandahl-Barth, 1949: synonym of Scalaribalcis angulata (Mandahl-Barth, 1949)
- Mucronalia birtsi Preston, 1904: synonym of Stilifer birtsi (Preston, 1904)
- Mucronalia capillastericola Minichev, 1970: synonym of Goodingia capillastericola (Minichev, 1970)
- Mucronalia cylindrica G. B. Sowerby III, 1900: synonym of Hypermastus cylindricus (G. B. Sowerby III, 1900)
- Mucronalia eburnea Schepman & Nierstrasz, 1909: synonym of Stilapex eburnea (Schepman & Nierstrasz, 1909)
- Mucronalia epibathra Melvill, 1906: synonym of Mumiola epibathra Melvill, 1906 (misapplication)
- Mucronalia gigas Kuroda & Habe, 1950: synonym of Melanella teinostoma (A. Adams, 1854)
- Mucronalia gracilis Pease, 1867: synonym of Peasistilifer gracilis (Pease, 1867)
- Mucronalia lactea A. Adams, 1864: synonym of Hypermastus lacteus (A. Adams, 1864)
- Mucronalia leucophaes Tomlin & Schackleford, 1913: synonym of Echineulima leucophaes (Tomlin & Shackleford, 1913)
- Mucronalia nidorum Pilsbry, 1956: synonym of Sabinella troglodytes (Thiele, 1925)
- Mucronalia nitidula Pease, 1860: synonym of Peasistilifer nitidula (Pease, 1860)
- Mucronalia ophiuraphila Habe, 1974: synonym of Goodingia ophiuraphila (Habe, 1974)
- Mucronalia ovata Pease, 1861: synonym of Echineulima ovata (Pease, 1861)
- Mucronalia palmipedis Koehler & Vaney, 1913: synonym of Apicalia palmipedis (Koehler & Vaney, 1913)
- Mucronalia philippinarum G. B. Sowerby III, 1900: synonym of Echineulima philippinarum (G. B. Sowerby III, 1900)
- Mucronalia suava Dall, 1927: synonym of Mucronalia mammillata Dall, 1927
- Mucronalia subula A. Adams, 1864: synonym of Hypermastus subula (A. Adams, 1864)
- Mucronalia variabilis Schepman, 1913: synonym of Melanella variabilis (Schepman & Nierstrasz, 1914) (original combination)
- Mucronalia varicosa Schepman, 1909: synonym of Goodingia varicosa (Schepman, 1909)
- Mucronalia xanthias Watson, 1886: synonym of Pelycidion xanthias (Watson, 1888)
