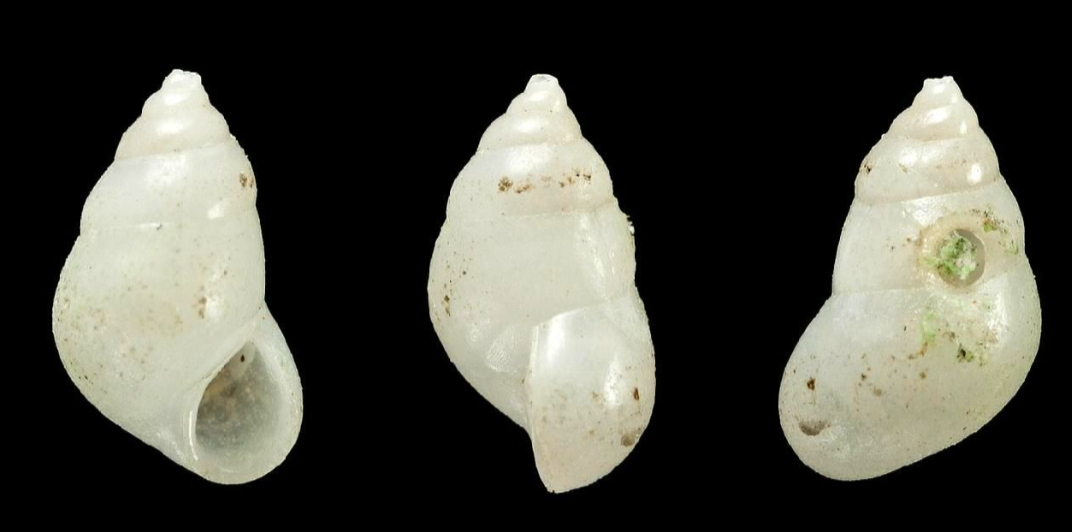
- Shell of Apicalia gibba

Scientific classification
- Kingdom: Animalia
- Phylum: Mollusca
- Class: Gastropoda
- Subclass: Caenogastropoda
- Order: Littorinimorpha
- Family: Eulimidae
- Genus: Apicalia; A. Adams, 1862

Synonyms
- Chryseulima Laseron, 1955

= Apicalia =

Genus of gastropods

Apicalia is a genus of medium-sized sea snails, marine gastropod mollusks in the family Eulimidae.

== Characteristics ==
(Original description in Latin) The shell is distorted, polished, imperforate, and subulate. It features irregular whorls, with the superior ones forming a distinct apex. The aperture is oblong, and the outer lip is simple.

It is milk-white, without any coloured markings, and the whorls are distorted; but it has the very peculiar mucro (a sharp, pointed tip or apex) observed in Stilifer and Mucronalia.

== Species ==
The species within this genus include:

- Apicalia angulata (Warén, 1981)
- Apicalia brazieri (Angas, 1877)
- Apicalia echinasteri (Warén, 1980)
- Apicalia gibba (A. Adams, 1862)
- Apicalia habei (Warén, 1980)
- Apicalia inflata (Tate & May, 1901)
- Apicalia ovata (Pease, 1860)
- Apicalia palmipedis (Koehler & Vaney, 1913)
- Apicalia taiwanica (Kuroda, 1964)
- Apicalia tryoni (Tate & May, 1900)

Species brought into synonymy

- Apicalia biformis (G.B. Sowerby III, 1897): synonym of Echineulima biformis (Sowerby III, 1897)
- Apicalia cicatricosa (Warén, 1981): synonym of Annulobalcis cicatricosa (Warén, 1981)
- Apicalia guentheri (Angas, 1877): synonym of Stilifer guentheri (Angas, 1877)
- Apicalia holdsworthi (H. Adams, 1874): synonym of Vitreobalcis holdsworthi (H. Adams, 1874)
- Apicalia immaculata (Pritchard & Gatliff, 1900): synonym of Apicalia brazieri (Angas, 1877)
- Apicalia mabuti (Nomura & Hatai, 1935): synonym of Parvioris fulvescens (A. Adams, 1866)
- Apicalia micans (Tenison Woods, 1875): synonym of Eulima tenisoni (Tryon, 1886)
- Apicalia sandwichensis [sic]: synonym of Mucronalia sandvichensis (G. B. Sowerby II, 1865): synonym of Apicalia ovata (Pease, 1861) (misspelling)
- Apicalia sowerbyi (Barnard, 1963): synonym of Parvioris sowerbyi (Barnard, 1963)

Species inquirenda

- Apicalia chuni Thiele, 1925.
- Apicalia melvilli (Schepman, 1909)
- Apicalia scitula H. Adams, 1867
