= Stilifer =

- Shell of Stilifer astericola

Scientific classification
- Kingdom: Animalia
- Phylum: Mollusca
- Class: Gastropoda
- Subclass: Caenogastropoda
- Order: Littorinimorpha
- Family: Eulimidae
- Genus: Stilifer; Broderip and Sowerby I, 1832

Type species
- Stilifer astericola Broderip, 1832

Synonyms
- Stylifer P. Fischer, 1864 (unjustified emendation [incorrect ubsequent spelling in Broderip, 1832; Stylifer fastigiatus A. Adams, 1853 (nomen nudum)

Genus of gastropods

Stilifer is a genus of small ectoparasitic sea snails that used to belong in the family Stiliferidae. Most recent sources consider it part of the family Eulimidae, which also belongs to the superfamily Eulimoidea.

== Description ==
"The imperforate, hyaline, thin shell has ab ovoid or elongated shape. It is smooth and polished. It contains numerous whorl. The apex is very sharp, sometimes bent. The nucleus is sinistral. The body whorl is globular. The aperture is suboval. The inner lip is smooth and arcuated. The outer lip is slightly sinuous, thin, and simple. There is no operculum.

The body of the animal is ciliated. The tentacles are slender, subulate, with eyes sessile at their outer bases. The mantle is reflected upon and more or less surrounding the shell, forming a siphonal lobe on the right side. The foot is linguiform, narrow and tubular in front, where it extends much beyond the head, attenuated behind, with a median groove below. The verge is sharp, elongated, resembling a tentacle.

This genus is commensal or parasitic in its habits, occurring on Echinoderms.

== Species ==
The World Register of Marine Species (WoRMS) includes the following species with accepted names in the genus Stilifer:

- Stilifer akahitode, Habe & Masuda, 1990
- Stilifer astericola, Broderip, 1832
- Stilifer birtsi, Preston, 1904
- Stilifer celebensis, Kükenthal, 1897
- Stilifer concavus, Warén, 1980
- Stilifer guentheri, Angas, 1877
- Stilifer inflatus, Warén, 1980
- Stilifer kawamurai, Habe, 1976
- Stilifer linckiae, P. Sarasin & F. Sarasin, 1887
- Stilifer ovoideus, H. Adams & A. Adams, 1853
- Stilifer pisum, Habe, 1953
- Stilifer quadrasi, O. Boettger, 1893
- Stilifer utinomi, Habe, 1951
- Stilifer variabilis, O. Boettger, 1893

Species brought into synonymy

- Stilifer abyssorum Locard, 1897: synonym of Pisolamia brychia (Watson, 1883)
- Stilifer acicula Gould, 1849: synonym of Melanella acicula (Gould, 1849)
- Stilifer attenuata Sowerby, 1878: synonym of Scalenostoma subulatum (Broderip, 1832)
- Stilifer auricula Hedley, 1907: synonym of Microstilifer auricula (Hedley, 1907)
- Stilifer barroni, A. Adams, 1854: synonym of Monogamus barronii (A. Adams, 1854) (superseded combination)
- Stilifer brychius Watson, 1883: synonym of Pisolamia brychia (Watson, 1883)
- Stilifer bulbiformis Sowerby, 1878: synonym of Scalenostoma subulatum (Broderip, 1832)
- Stilifer crotaphis Watson, 1886: synonym of Scalenostoma lodderae (Petterd, 1884)
- Stilifer curtus (A. E. Verrill, 1882): synonym of Pelseneeria stimpsonii (A. E. Verrill, 1872)
- Stilifer deformis Pease, 1867: synonym of Scalenostoma subulatum (Broderip, 1832)
- Stilifer exarata A. Adams, 1855: synonym of Scalenostoma subulatum (Broderip, 1832)
- Stilifer fastigiata Sowerby, 1878: synonym of Scalenostoma subulatum (Broderip, 1832)
- Stilifer kochianus G. B. Sowerby III, 1901: synonym of Stilifer variabilis O. Boettger, 1893
- Stilifer lodderae Petterd, 1884: synonym of Scalenostoma lodderae (Petterd, 1884)
- Stilifer minima Dall, 1927: synonym of Ophieulima minima (Dall, 1927)
- Stilifer minimus Dall, 1927: synonym of Ophieulima minima (Dall, 1927)
- Stilifer minuta Dall, 1927: synonym of Pelseneeria minuta (Dall, 1927)
- Stilifer mittrei Petit de la Saussaye, 1851: synonym of Echineulima mittrei (Petit de la Saussaye, 1851)
- Stilifer neozelanica Dell, 1956: synonym of Iphitus neozelanicus (Dell, 1956)
- Stilifer ophidiastericola Habe, 1951: synonym of Stilifer utinomi Habe, 1951
- Stilifer orbiculatus Hedley, 1907: synonym of Fossarella orbiculatus (Hedley, 1907)
- Stilifer palucciae P. Fischer, 1864: synonym of Echineulima palucciae (P. Fischer, 1864)
- Stilifer parva Schepman, 1909: synonym of Stilapex parva (Schepman, 1909)
- Stilifer perdepressus Dall, 1925: synonym of Pelseneeria perdepressa (Dall, 1925)
- Stilifer petterdi Tate & May, 1901: synonym of Scalenostoma lodderae (Petterd, 1884)
- Stilifer polaris Hedley, 1916: synonym of Stilapex polaris (Hedley, 1916)
- Stilifer pyramidalis Reeve, 1859: synonym of Scalenostoma subulatum (Broderip, 1832)
- Stilifer robusta Petterd, 1884: synonym of Scalenostoma lodderae (Petterd, 1884)
- Stilifer sibogae Schepman & Nierstrasz, 1909: synonym of Pelseneeria sibogae (Schepman & Nierstrasz, 1909)
- Stilifer solida Sowerby, 1878: synonym of Scalenostoma subulatum (Broderip, 1832)
- Stilifer speciosus H. Adams, 1869: synonym of Scalenostoma subulatum (Broderip, 1832)
- Stilifer sphaeroconcha Habe, 1974: synonym of Tropiometricola sphaeroconcha (Habe, 1974)
- Stilifer subangulatus A. Adams, 1855: synonym of Scalenostoma subulatum (Broderip, 1832)
- Stilifer subulatus Broderip, 1832: synonym of Scalenostoma subulatum (Broderip, 1832)
- Stilifer thielei Sturany, 1903: synonym of Stilapex thielei (Sturany, 1903)
- Stilifer thomasiae Sowerby, 1878: synonym of Scalenostoma subulatum (Broderip, 1832)
- Stilifer variciferus Hedley, 1899: synonym of Scalenostoma subulatum (Broderip, 1832)
- Stilifer verrilli Dall, 1927: synonym of Pelseneeria stimpsonii (A. E. Verrill, 1872)
