= Stilifer celebensis =

- Pseudopallium of Stilifer celebensis

Scientific classification
- Kingdom: Animalia
- Phylum: Mollusca
- Class: Gastropoda
- Subclass: Caenogastropoda
- Order: Littorinimorpha
- Family: Eulimidae
- Genus: Stilifer
- Species: S. celebensis

Binomial name
- Stilifer celebensis Kükenthal, 1897

Species of gastropod

Stilifer celebensis is a species of sea snail, a marine gastropod mollusk in the family Eulimidae. The species is one of a number within the genus Stilifer.

== Description ==
(Original description in German) This species was found on a starfish from the genus Choriaster. It must be regarded as a transitional form between Stilifer linckiae and Mucronalia eburnea. It is to be designated provisionally as Stilifer celebensis.

The animal, which had been preserved in chromic acid and therefore no longer possessed a solid shell, measured 4.5 mm in length. Whereas in Stilifer linckiae the pseudopallium almost completely covers the animal, here three whorls still protrude from the opening of the pseudopallium. The proboscis is relatively short and stout.

Unlike Stilifer linckiae, the present species has a very weakly developed pseudopallium, which becomes progressively thinner towards the top, whereas in Stilifer linckiae it attains considerable thickness. The pseudopallium of the present species is thus shown to be a fold of skin, differing from the skin fold only by its considerably greater size.

Among further differences, it should also be noted that the species possesses rudimentary tentacles, in which the eyes are situated, and that it lacks a blood space surrounding the oesophagus. The space between the epidermis and the oesophagus of the proboscis is filled exclusively with connective tissue and musculature. No pedal gland could be seen.

== Distribution ==
This marine species occurs off Sulawesi (Indonesia) and off Oman.
