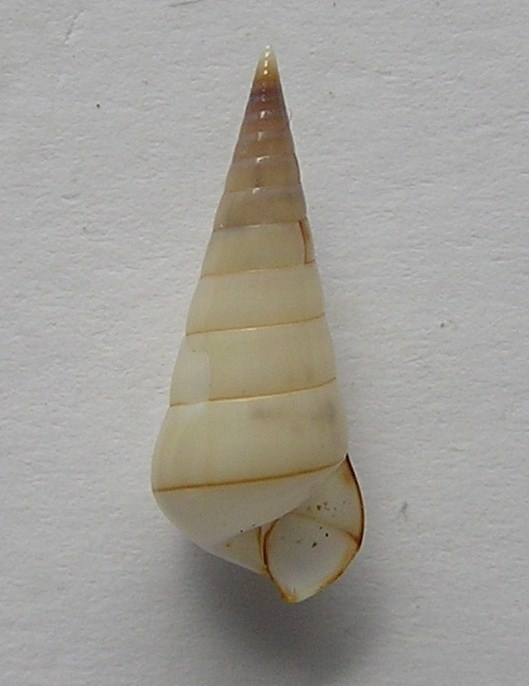
- Niso hizenensis

Scientific classification
- Kingdom: Animalia
- Phylum: Mollusca
- Class: Gastropoda
- Subclass: Caenogastropoda
- Order: Littorinimorpha
- Superfamily: Vanikoroidea
- Family: Eulimidae
- Genus: Niso; Risso, 1826

Type species
- Boreotrophon echinus Dall, 1918

Synonyms
- † Bonellia Deshayes, 1838 (invalid: junior homonym of Bonellia Rolando, 1822; Ebion is a substitute name); † Ebion Gistel, 1848; † Janella Grateloup, 1838; Melania (Bonellia) Deshayes, 1838 junior subjective synonym; Neovolusia Emerson, 1965; Niso (Neovolusia) W. K. Emerson, 1965 alternative representation; Niso (Niso) Risso, 1826; Niso (Volusia) A. Adams, 1861 (original rank); Volusia A. Adams, 1851 (Invalid: junior homonym of Volusia Robineau-Desvoidy, 1830 [Diptera]; Neovolusia is a replacement name)

= Niso =

Genus of gastropods

Niso is a genus of very small parasitic sea snails, marine gastropod mollusks or micromollusks in the family Eulimidae.

== General characteristics ==
Eulimidae having the base broadly umbilicated.

== Species ==
According to the World Register of Marine Species (WoRMS) the following species with accepted names are included within the genus Niso

- † Niso acarinatoconica Sacco, 1892
- Niso aeglees Bush, 1885
- Niso albida Dall, 1889
- Niso alfredensis Bartsch, 1915
- † Niso angusta Deshayes, 1862
- † Niso antiselli Anderson and Martin, 1914
- Niso attilioi (Hertz & Hertz, 1982)
- Niso balteata G. B. Sowerby III, 1900
- † Niso basiglobosa Marwick, 1942
- Niso baueri Emerson, 1965
- Niso brunnea (G. B. Sowerby I, 1834)
- † Niso canaliculata Koenen, 1882
- Niso candidula A. Adams, 1854
- Niso chevreuxi Dautzenberg, 1891
- Niso circinata Dall, 1889
- † Niso constricta Deshayes, 1862
- † Niso degrangei Cossmann & Peyrot, 1917
- Niso dorcas Kuroda & Habe, 1950
- † Niso eburnea Risso, 1826
- Niso emersoni McLean, 1970
- Niso excolpa Bartsch, 1917
- Niso foresti Bouchet & Warén, 1986
- Niso goniostoma A. Adams, 1854
- † Niso grandis Gabb, 1873
- Niso hendersoni Bartsch, 1953
- Niso hizensis Kuroda & Habe, 1950
- Niso imbricata (Sowerby I, 1834)
- Niso interrupta (G. B. Sowerby I, 1834)
- † Niso kimberi Pritchard, 1906
- Niso lomana Bartsch, 1917
- Niso marmorata (G. B. Sowerby I, 1834)
- Niso matsumotoi Kuroda & Habe, 1961
- Niso microforis Dall, 1927
- † Niso minuta Gabb, 1873
- † Niso morleti Cossmann, 1888
- Niso nakayasui Habe, 1976
- † Niso neozelanica Suter, 1917
- † Niso obtusocarinata Makiyama, 1927
- Niso penipauliasi T. Cossignani & Lorenz, 2022
- † Niso polita Gabb, 1864
- Niso portoricensis Dall & Simpson, 1901
- † Niso psila Tenison Woods, 1879
- Niso pura (Melvill & Standen, 1901)
- † Niso putata Finlay & Marwick, 1937
- Niso pyramidelloides Nevill, 1871
- Niso regia Kuroda & Habe, 1950
- Niso richardi Dautzenberg & Fischer, 1897
- Niso rubrapicata Habe, 1976
- Niso smithi Schepman, 1909
- Niso splendidula (G. B. Sowerby I, 1834)
- Niso stenomphala Kuroda & Habe, 1950
- Niso sumatrana Thiele, 1925
- † Niso terebellata (Lamarck, 1804)
- Niso terebellum (Dillwyn, 1817)
- Niso tetuakii Habe, 1949
- Niso tricolor Dall, 1889
- Niso trilineata Mörch, 1872
- † Niso turrioides C.-H. Hu, 1991
- † Niso umbilicata (I. Lea, 1833)
- Niso venosa Sowerby III, 1895
- Niso yokoyamai Kuroda & Habe, 1950

Species brought into synonymy

- Niso babylonica (Bartsch, 1912): synonym of Niso rangi (de Folin, 1867)
- Niso hipolitensis Bartsch, 1917: synonym of Subniso hipolitensis (Bartsch, 1917) (original combination)
- Niso joubini Dautzenberg & Fischer H., 1897: synonym of Costaclis mizon (Watson, 1881)
- Niso mucronetincta Thiele, 1925 : synonym of Thaleia mucronetincta (Thiele, 1925)
- Niso quadrasi Boettger, 1893: synonym of Stilifer variabilis O. Boettger, 1893
- Niso rangi (de Folin, 1867): synonym of Subniso rangi (de Folin, 1867)
- Niso rubropicta [sic]: synonym of Niso rubrapicata Habe, 1976 (misspelling)
- Niso sandwichensis [sic]: synonym of Apicalia sandvichensis (G.B. Sowerby II, 1865)
