= Sabinella =

- Shell of Sabinella meridionalis

Scientific classification
- Kingdom: Animalia
- Phylum: Mollusca
- Class: Gastropoda
- Subclass: Caenogastropoda
- Order: Littorinimorpha
- Family: Eulimidae
- Genus: Sabinella; Monterosato, 1890

Synonyms
- Eulimoda Laseron, 1955

Genus of gastropods

Sabinella is a genus of very small ectoparasitic sea snails, marine gastropod mollusks or micromollusks in the Eulimidae family. This genus was first described by Monterosato in 1890.

== Species ==
Species within the genera Sabinella include:

- Sabinella bonifaciae (F. Nordsieck, 1974)
- Sabinella chathamensis Bartsch, 1917
- Sabinella cysticola Koehler & Vaney, 1925
- Sabinella infrapatula Murdoch & Suter, 1906
- Sabinella meridionalis Bartsch, 1917
- Sabinella munita Hedley, 1903
- Sabinella opalina (de Folin, 1867)
- Sabinella orbignyanum Hupé, 1860
- Sabinella pachya Dautzenberg & H. Fischer, 1896
- Sabinella schoutanica May, 1916
- Sabinella shaskyi Warén, 1992
- Sabinella troglodytes Thiele, 1925

Species brought into synonymy

- Sabinella bakeri Bartsch, 1917 : synonym of Pseudosabinella bakeri (Bartsch, 1917)
- Sabinella nidorum (Pilsbry, 1956) : synonym of Sabinella troglodytes (Thiele, 1925)
- *Sabinella piriformis Brugnone, 1873; synonym of Sabinella bonifaciae (F. Nordsieck, 1974)
- Sabinella ptilocrinicola (Bartsch, 1907) : synonym of Crinolamia ptilocrinicola (Bartsch, 1909)
