= Melanella opalina =

Scientific classification
- Kingdom: Animalia
- Phylum: Mollusca
- Class: Gastropoda
- Subclass: Caenogastropoda
- Order: Littorinimorpha
- Family: Eulimidae
- Genus: Melanella
- Species: M. opalina

Binomial name
- Melanella opalina (J. T. Marshall, 1901)

Synonyms
- Eulima opalina J. T. Marshall, 1901

Species of gastropod

Melanella opalina is a species of sea snail, a marine gastropod mollusk in the family Eulimidae. The species is one of many species known to exist within the genus, Melanella.

== Taxonomy ==
The name is accepted as an unreplaced junior homonym of Eulima opalina de Folin, 1867

The original name Melanella opalina (de Folin, 1867) is a synonym of Sabinella opalina (de Folin, 1867)

== Description ==
(Original description) Eulima opalina appears to differ from Eulima intermedia Cantraine, 1835 (synonym of Melanella polita (Linnaeus, 1758)) in outline only; the base is somewhat broader.

== Distribution ==
This marine species occurs off Panama.
