= Echineulima robusta =

Scientific classification
- Kingdom: Animalia
- Phylum: Mollusca
- Class: Gastropoda
- Subclass: Caenogastropoda
- Order: Littorinimorpha
- Family: Eulimidae
- Genus: Echineulima
- Species: E. robusta

Binomial name
- Echineulima robusta Pease, 1860

Species of gastropod

Echineulima robusta is a species of sea snail, a marine gastropod mollusk in the family Eulimidae.

== Distribution ==
This marine species is mainly distributed around the Hawaiian Islands.
