= Apicalia echinasteri =

Scientific classification
- Kingdom: Animalia
- Phylum: Mollusca
- Class: Gastropoda
- Subclass: Caenogastropoda
- Order: Littorinimorpha
- Family: Eulimidae
- Genus: Apicalia
- Species: A. echinasteri

Binomial name
- Apicalia echinasteri Warén, 1980

Species of gastropod

Apicalia echinasteri is a species of sea snail, a marine gastropod mollusk in the family Eulimidae.

This species is ectoparasitic on the starfish Echinaster luzonicus

== Distribution ==
This marine species occurs off Australia (Queensland).
