= Echineulima ponderi =

Scientific classification
- Kingdom: Animalia
- Phylum: Mollusca
- Class: Gastropoda
- Subclass: Caenogastropoda
- Order: Littorinimorpha
- Family: Eulimidae
- Genus: Echineulima
- Species: E. ponderi

Binomial name
- Echineulima ponderi Warén, 1980

Species of gastropod

Echineulima ponderi is a species of sea snail, a marine gastropod mollusk in the family Eulimidae.
