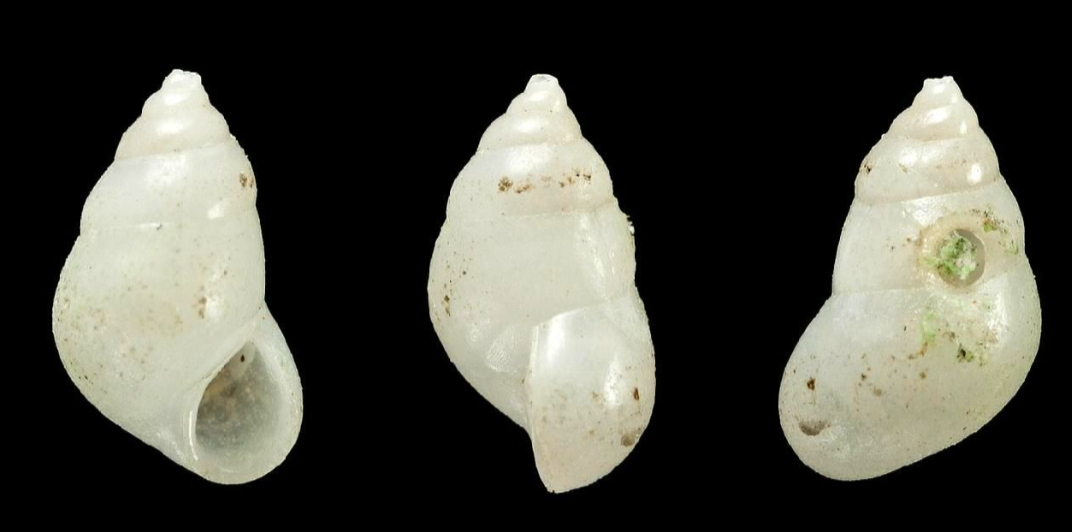
- Shell of Apicalia gibba (specimen at the Natural History Museum, London)

Scientific classification
- Kingdom: Animalia
- Phylum: Mollusca
- Class: Gastropoda
- Subclass: Caenogastropoda
- Order: Littorinimorpha
- Family: Eulimidae
- Genus: Apicalia
- Species: A. gibba

Binomial name
- Apicalia gibba A. Adams, 1862

= Apicalia gibba =

Species of gastropod

Apicalia gibba is a species of sea snail, a marine gastropod mollusk in the family Eulimidae.

== Description ==
(Original description) The oblique shell has an elevated-conical shape. It is white, solid, and scarcely opaque. There are four normal whorls, which are convex and somewhat swollen, with the uppermost narrowed and arranged in the form of a mucro (a sharp point). The aperture is oblique and ovate, and the outer lip is slightly thickened.

== Distribution ==
This marine species occurs off Japan.
