= Apicalia inflata =

Scientific classification
- Kingdom: Animalia
- Phylum: Mollusca
- Class: Gastropoda
- Subclass: Caenogastropoda
- Order: Littorinimorpha
- Family: Eulimidae
- Genus: Apicalia
- Species: A. inflata

Binomial name
- Apicalia inflata Tate & May, 1901

Synonyms
- Eulima inflata Tate & May, 1901; Melanella inflata (Tate & May 1900)

Species of gastropod

Apicalia inflata is a species of sea snail, a marine gastropod mollusk in the family Eulimidae.

== Description ==
The length of the shell (without protoconch) attains 6.25 mm, its diameter 3 mm.

(Original description) The shell's whorls exhibit a slightly irregular convexity; the penultimate whorl is somewhat contracted, while the body whorl is notably inflated and regularly convex. The aperture is relatively small, possessing a roundly oval shape and showing minimal obliquity. The outer lip maintains its position without retreating at the sutural margin.

== Distribution ==
This marine species is endemic to Australia and occurs off South Australia, Tasmania and Victoria
