= Niso lomana =

- Shell of Niso lomana

Scientific classification
- Kingdom: Animalia
- Phylum: Mollusca
- Class: Gastropoda
- Subclass: Caenogastropoda
- Order: Littorinimorpha
- Family: Eulimidae
- Genus: Niso
- Species: N. lomana

Binomial name
- Niso lomana Bartsch, 1917

Species of gastropod

Niso lomana is a species of micromollusk in the family Eulimidae.

== Description ==
The length of the remaining whorls of the holotype attains 14.5 mm.

(Original description) The large shell is broadly conic, and yellowish-white in color. The holotype has lost the early whorls and the base.The early whorls are well rounded, while the later ones are flattened. They are separated by a decidedly channeled suture, are narrowly shouldered at the summit, and are decidedly angulated at the periphery. They are marked only by feeble axial lines of growth. The summit of succeeding whorls falls a little anteriorly to the angulated periphery and forms a channeled suture. The aperture of this type specimen is fractured.

== Distribution ==
The species occurs in the Pacific Ocean off the United States, Mexico and Costa Rica.
