= Stilifer astericola =

- Shell of Stilifer astericola (syntype at the Natural History Museum, London)

Scientific classification
- Kingdom: Animalia
- Phylum: Mollusca
- Class: Gastropoda
- Subclass: Caenogastropoda
- Order: Littorinimorpha
- Family: Eulimidae
- Genus: Stilifer
- Species: S. astericola

Binomial name
- Stilifer astericola (Broderip, 1832)

Species of gastropod

Stilifer astericola is a parasitic sea snail, a marine gastropod mollusk in the taxonomic family Eulimidae. It is the type species of the genus Stilifer.

== Description ==
The length of the shell attains 8.6 mm, its diameter 6.3 mm.

The shell is large and globose, with a slender acuminate apex that is usually decollated. It is thin, semitransparent, and bluish-white. The postnuclear whorls are strongly inflated and marked by strong incremental lines, which are almost threadlike and irregularly disposed. The appressed portion of the whorls appears as a bluish band. The body whorl is slightly flattened in the middle, and the periphery is well rounded. The base is short, strongly rounded, and marked like the spire. The aperture is large; the posterior angle is acute; the outer lip is very thin, strongly curved, and strongly protracted in the middle to form a clawlike element; the inner lip is slender and strongly curved; and the parietal wall is covered by a scarcely perceptible callus. The radula is absent.

== Distribution ==
The species was discovered in Galapagos Archipelago by Hugh Cuming. It was found burrowing in different parts of the oral disc of Heliaster cumingi.

This species occurs off the Galápagos Islands.
