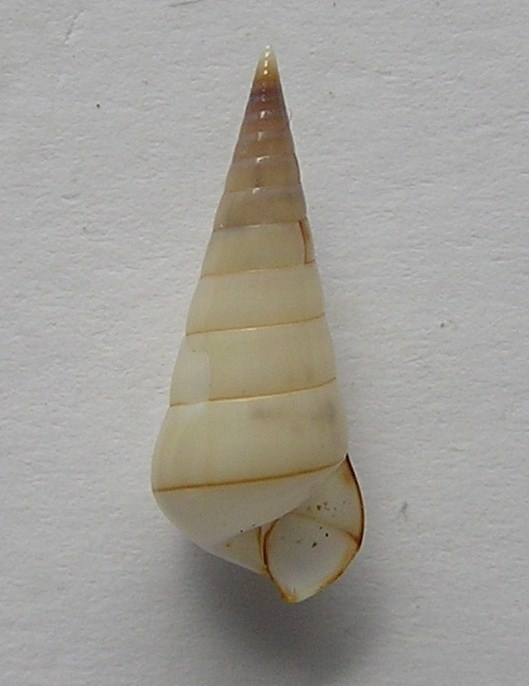
- Niso hizenensis

Scientific classification
- Kingdom: Animalia
- Phylum: Mollusca
- Class: Gastropoda
- Subclass: Caenogastropoda
- Order: Littorinimorpha
- Family: Eulimidae
- Genus: Niso
- Species: N. hizensis

Binomial name
- Niso hizensis (Kuroda & Habe, 1950)

= Niso hizensis =

Niso

Species of gastropod

Niso hizensis is a species of micromollusk in the family Eulimidae.
