= Stilifer variabilis =

Scientific classification
- Kingdom: Animalia
- Phylum: Mollusca
- Class: Gastropoda
- Subclass: Caenogastropoda
- Order: Littorinimorpha
- Family: Eulimidae
- Genus: Stilifer
- Species: S. variabilis

Binomial name
- Stilifer variabilis O. Boettger, 1893

Synonyms
- Niso quadrasi Boettger, 1893; Stilifer kochianus G.B. Sowerby III, 1901; Stylifer variabilis O. Boettger, 1893

Species of gastropod

Stilifer variabilis is a species of sea snail, a marine gastropod mollusk in the family Eulimidae. The species is one of a number within the genus Stilifer.

== Description ==
The length of the shell varies between 5.5 mm and 6.5 mm; its maximum diameter between 3 mm and 3.75 mm.

(Original description in Latin) The shell belongs to the group of Stilifer quadrasi, but is much smaller, ovate rather than globose, with an exactly conical spire, and the body whorl exceeds the spire.

The shell is perforate as far as the apex; it is either ovately or oblong-conically shaped, delicate, fragile, subpellucid, and whitish, with a horny-yellowish, somewhat shining spire. The spire is more or less elevated, regularly conical, and finely striated on its sides; the apex is acute, mucronate, and not distorted.

There are eight flattened whorls, separated by a distinct, somewhat marginated suture; they increase rather rapidly in size and are densely finely striated and decussated by very obsolete spiral lines. The body whorl is more ventricose and convex at the base, slightly exceeding one half of the height of the shell.

The aperture is somewhat oblique and receding at the base; it is irregularly oval, acute above, and drawn to the left and rounded below. The peristome is simple and acute, with its margins joined by a slight, broad callus; the right margin descends rather steeply and is well rounded at the base, while the columellar margin is strongly spirally twisted and slightly thickened.

There is no operculum.

== Distribution ==
This species occurs in the Indo-West-Pacific; also off Australia (Northern Territory, Western Australia)
