= Apicalia tryoni =

Scientific classification
- Kingdom: Animalia
- Phylum: Mollusca
- Class: Gastropoda
- Subclass: Caenogastropoda
- Order: Littorinimorpha
- Family: Eulimidae
- Genus: Apicalia
- Species: A. tryoni

Binomial name
- Apicalia tryoni (Tate & May, 1900)

Synonyms
- Eulima tryoni Tate & May, 1900; Melanella tryoni (Tate & May, 1900)

Species of gastropod

Apicalia tryoni is a species of sea snail, a marine gastropod mollusk in the family Eulimidae.

== Distribution ==
This marine species is endemic to Australia and occurs off Tasmania, Victoria and Western Australia.
