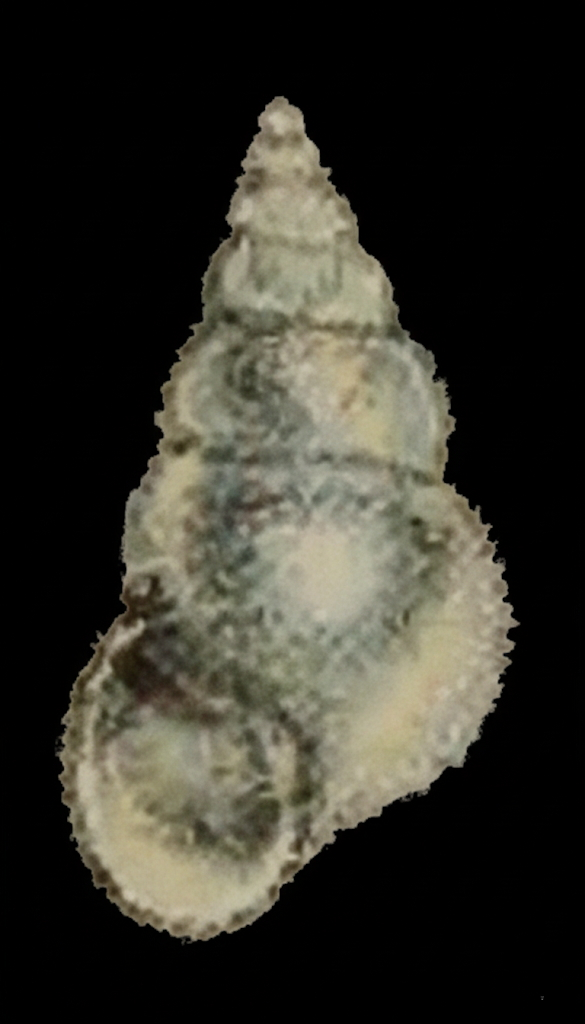
- Shell of Apicalia brazieri

Scientific classification
- Kingdom: Animalia
- Phylum: Mollusca
- Class: Gastropoda
- Subclass: Caenogastropoda
- Order: Littorinimorpha
- Family: Eulimidae
- Genus: Apicalia
- Species: A. brazieri

Binomial name
- Apicalia brazieri (Angas, 1877)

Synonyms
- Apicalia immaculata (Pritchard & Gatliff, 1900); Stylifer brazeri Angas, 1877; Stylifer immaculata Pritchard & Gatliff, 1900

= Apicalia brazieri =

Species of gastropod

Apicalia brazieri, common name Brazier's stilifer, is a species of sea snail, a marine gastropod mollusk in the family Eulimidae.

== Description ==
(Original description) The shell is rather acuminately ovate. It is smooth, pellucid, white, and polished. It has 6 rounded whorls, flattened just below the very finely callously marginate sutures. The spire is elevated, with a styliform (slender, pointed, and shaped like a stylus) apex. The aperture is subovate, pointed posteriorly and rounded anteriorly. The outer lip is thin and simple. The columella is arcuate and very slightly thickened superiorly, with its margins joined by a thin, distinct callus.

This species is endoparasitic o the starfish Coscinasterias calamaria.

== Distribution ==
This marine species is endemic to Australia and occurs off New South Wales, Tasmania, Victoria and Western Australia.
