= Niso excolpa =

- Shell of Niso excolpa

Scientific classification
- Kingdom: Animalia
- Phylum: Mollusca
- Class: Gastropoda
- Subclass: Caenogastropoda
- Order: Littorinimorpha
- Family: Eulimidae
- Genus: Niso
- Species: N. excolpa

Binomial name
- Niso excolpa Bartsch, 1917

Synonyms

Species of gastropod

Niso excolpa is a species of micromollusk in the family Eulimidae.

== Description ==
The length of the shell (without the first whorl) attains 17.5 mm, its diameter 6.5 mm. It is one of the larger species in Niso known from the west coast of America.

(Original description) The shell is broadly elongate‑conic, widely and openly umbilicated. It is flesh‑colored, with irregularly interrupted axial bands of brown immediately behind the varices, and with faint spiral bands. The junction of these bands produces intensified color markings, and the lighter areas between them give the axial markings their interrupted aspect. The umbilicus is purple; the extreme tip of the shell is white.

The holotype has lost the first whorl with fourteen whorls remaining. The early whorls are well rounded; the later whorls are flattened and are marked by strong growth lines only. The appressed summit of each whorl falls slightly anterior to the periphery, causing the preceding whorl to present an overhanging appearance. The periphery of the body whorl is strongly angulated. The base is moderately long and well rounded; the umbilicus measures about one‑sixth of the shell's greater diameter.

The aperture is rhomboidal, decidedly angulated at the junction of the inner and basal lips and somewhat less so at the junction of the basal and outer lips; the posterior angle is acute. The inner lip is strongly curved and moderately reflexed; the parietal wall is glazed by a thin callus.

== Distribution ==
The species occurs in the Pacific Ocean off the Mexico (Baja California) and Panama.
