= Annulobalcis pellucida =

Scientific classification
- Kingdom: Animalia
- Phylum: Mollusca
- Class: Gastropoda
- Subclass: Caenogastropoda
- Order: Littorinimorpha
- Family: Eulimidae
- Genus: Annulobalcis
- Species: A. pellucida

Binomial name
- Annulobalcis pellucida (Turton, 1832)

Synonyms
- Bullia pellucida Turton, 1832

Species of gastropod

Annulobalcis pellucida is a species of sea snail, a marine gastropod mollusc in the family Eulimidae.
