= Niso splendidula =

- Shell of Niso splendidula (specimen at the Smithsonian Institution)

Scientific classification
- Kingdom: Animalia
- Phylum: Mollusca
- Class: Gastropoda
- Subclass: Caenogastropoda
- Order: Littorinimorpha
- Family: Eulimidae
- Genus: Niso
- Species: N. splendidula

Binomial name
- Niso splendidula (G. B. Sowerby I, 1834)

Synonyms
- Bonellia splendidula (G. B. Sowerby I, 1834); Eulima splendidula G. B. Sowerby I, 1834 ·

Species of gastropod

Niso splendidula is a species of micromollusk in the family Eulimidae.

== Description ==
The length of the shell attains 38 mm, its diameter 17 mm. It is one of the largest species in Niso known from the west coast of America.

(Original description) The brownish shell is acuminately pyramidal. The shell contains 18 whorls. The shell is near the sutures articulated in alternating white and chestnut markings. The umbilicus is large, and the aperture is angulated anteriorly.

== Disitribution ==
The species occurs in the Pacific Ocean off the United States, Mexico, Panama and Ecuador
