= Annulobalcis marshalli =

Scientific classification
- Kingdom: Animalia
- Phylum: Mollusca
- Class: Gastropoda
- Subclass: Caenogastropoda
- Order: Littorinimorpha
- Family: Eulimidae
- Genus: Annulobalcis
- Species: A. marshalli

Binomial name
- Annulobalcis marshalli Warén, 1981

Species of gastropod

Annulobalcis marshalli is a species of sea snail, a marine gastropod mollusc in the family Eulimidae.
