= Echineulima asthenosomae =

Scientific classification
- Kingdom: Animalia
- Phylum: Mollusca
- Class: Gastropoda
- Subclass: Caenogastropoda
- Order: Littorinimorpha
- Family: Eulimidae
- Genus: Echineulima
- Species: E. asthenosomae

Binomial name
- Echineulima asthenosomae Warén, 1980

Synonyms
- Luetzenia asthenosomae Warén, 1980

Species of gastropod

Echineulima asthenosomae is a species of sea snail, a marine gastropod mollusk in the family Eulimidae.
