= Apicalia taiwanica =

Scientific classification
- Kingdom: Animalia
- Phylum: Mollusca
- Class: Gastropoda
- Subclass: Caenogastropoda
- Order: Littorinimorpha
- Family: Eulimidae
- Genus: Apicalia
- Species: A. taiwanica

Binomial name
- Apicalia taiwanica Kuroda, 1964

Species of gastropod

Apicalia taiwanica is a species of sea snail, a marine gastropod mollusk in the family Eulimidae.

== Distribution ==
This marine species occurs off Taiwan.
