= Crinolamia kermadecensis =

Scientific classification
- Kingdom: Animalia
- Phylum: Mollusca
- Class: Gastropoda
- Subclass: Caenogastropoda
- Order: Littorinimorpha
- Family: Eulimidae
- Genus: Crinolamia
- Species: C. kermadecensis

Binomial name
- Crinolamia kermadecensis Knudsen, 1964

Synonyms
- Aclis kermadecensis Knudsen, 1964

Species of gastropod

Crinolamia kermadecensis is a species of sea snail, a marine gastropod mollusk in the family Eulimidae.

== Distribution ==
This species occurs in the following locations:

- Norwegian waters
