= Stilifer akahitode =

- Shell of Stilifer akahitode (specimen at Naturalis Biodiversity Center)

Scientific classification
- Kingdom: Animalia
- Phylum: Mollusca
- Class: Gastropoda
- Subclass: Caenogastropoda
- Order: Littorinimorpha
- Family: Eulimidae
- Genus: Stilifer
- Species: S. akahitode

Binomial name
- Stilifer akahitode Habe & Masuda, 1990

Species of gastropod

Stilifer akahitode is a species of sea snail, a marine gastropod mollusk in the family Eulimidae. The species is one of a number within the genus Stilifer.

== Distribution ==
This marine species occurs off Japan, Korean and Taiwan
