= Crinolamia edwardiensis =

Scientific classification
- Kingdom: Animalia
- Phylum: Mollusca
- Class: Gastropoda
- Subclass: Caenogastropoda
- Order: Littorinimorpha
- Family: Eulimidae
- Genus: Crinolamia
- Species: C. edwardiensis

Binomial name
- Crinolamia edwardiensis Watson, 1880

Synonyms
- Jeffreysia edwardiensis Watson, 1880

Species of gastropod

Crinolamia edwardiensis is a species of sea snail, a marine gastropod mollusk in the family Eulimidae. This was the first species to receive a taxonomic authority within the genus, Crinolamia, by Watson in 1880.
