= Sabinella chathamensis =

- Shell of Sabinella chathamensis

Scientific classification
- Kingdom: Animalia
- Phylum: Mollusca
- Class: Gastropoda
- Subclass: Caenogastropoda
- Order: Littorinimorpha
- Family: Eulimidae
- Genus: Sabinella
- Species: S. chathamensis

Binomial name
- Sabinella chathamensis (Bartsch, 1917)

Species of gastropod

on

Sabinella chathamensis is a species of small sea snail, a marine gastropod mollusk in the family Eulimidae. The scientific name of this species was first published in 1917 by Bartsch.

== Description ==
The length of the shell attains 3.8 mm, its diameter 1.3 mm.

(Original description) The broadly conic shell is yellowish-white, polished, and marked by exceedingly fine protractive lines of growth only. The shell contains nine whorls. The first two whorls are well rounded and separated by a well-impressed suture, while the succeeding ones are moderately rounded.

The aperture is very large and somewhat channeled anteriorly, with an acute posterior angle. The outer lip is very strongly protracted between the posterior angle and the base, forming a decidedly claw-like element. The inner lip is decidedly curved, revolute, and has its posterior half appressed to the base. The parietal wall is covered with a thin callus.
