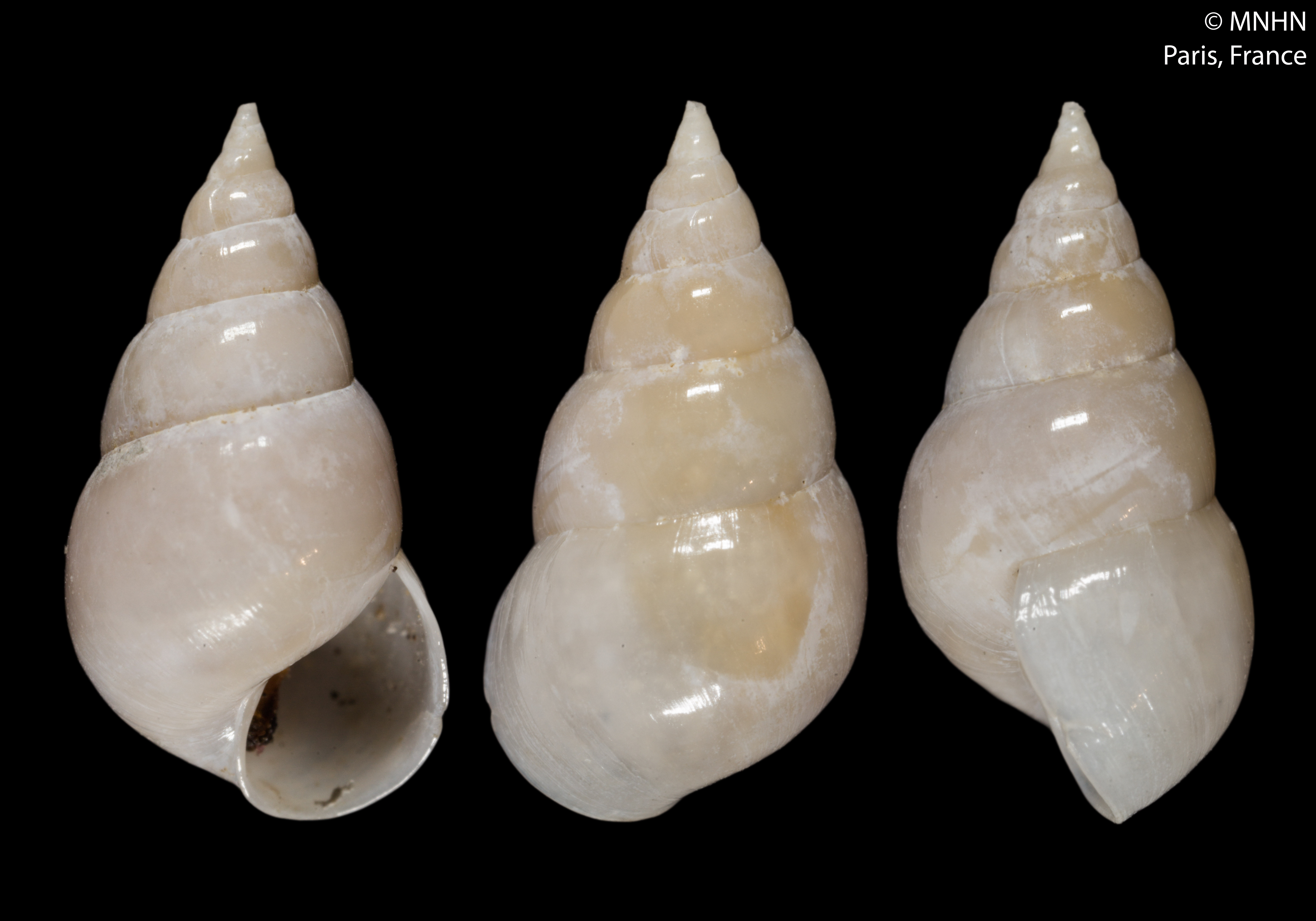
- Shell of Echineulima mittrei (syntype at MNHN, Paris)

Scientific classification
- Kingdom: Animalia
- Phylum: Mollusca
- Class: Gastropoda
- Subclass: Caenogastropoda
- Order: Littorinimorpha
- Superfamily: Vanikoroidea
- Family: Eulimidae
- Genus: Echineulima; Lützen & Nielsen, 1975

Type species
- Stilifer mittrei Petit de la Saussaye, 1851

Synonyms
- Luetzenia Warén, 1980 (Invalid: junior homonym of Luetzenia Rehder, 1980)

= Echineulima =

Genus of gastropods

Echineulima is a genus of sea snails, marine gastropod mollusks in the family Eulimidae.

== Species ==
The species within this genus include the following:

- Echineulima asthenosomae (Warén, 1980)
- Echineulima biformis (G. B. Sowerby III, 1897)
- Echineulima leucophaes (Tomlin & Shackleford, 1913)
- Echineulima mittrei (Petit de la Saussaye, 1851)
- Echineulima ovata (Pease, 1861)
- Echineulima paulucciae (Fischer, 1864)
- Echineulima philippinarum (G. B. Sowerby III, 1900)
- Echineulima ponderi (Warén, 1980)
- Echineulima robusta (Pease, 1860)
- Echineulima thaanumi (Pilsbry, 1921)
- Echineulima toki (Habe, 1974)

Species brought into synonymy

- Echineulima apiculata (Souverbie, 1862): synonym of Echineulima mittrei (Petit de la Saussaye, 1851)
- Echineulima dubia (Baird, 1873): synonym of Echineulima mittrei (Petit de la Saussaye, 1851)
- Echineulima eburnea (Deshayes, 1863): synonym of Echineulima mittrei (Petit de la Saussaye, 1851)
- Echineulima palucciae [sic]: synonym of Echineulima paulucciae (P. Fischer, 1864)
- Echineulima tokiokai (Habe, 1952): synonym of Echineulima mittrei (Petit de la Saussaye, 1851)
