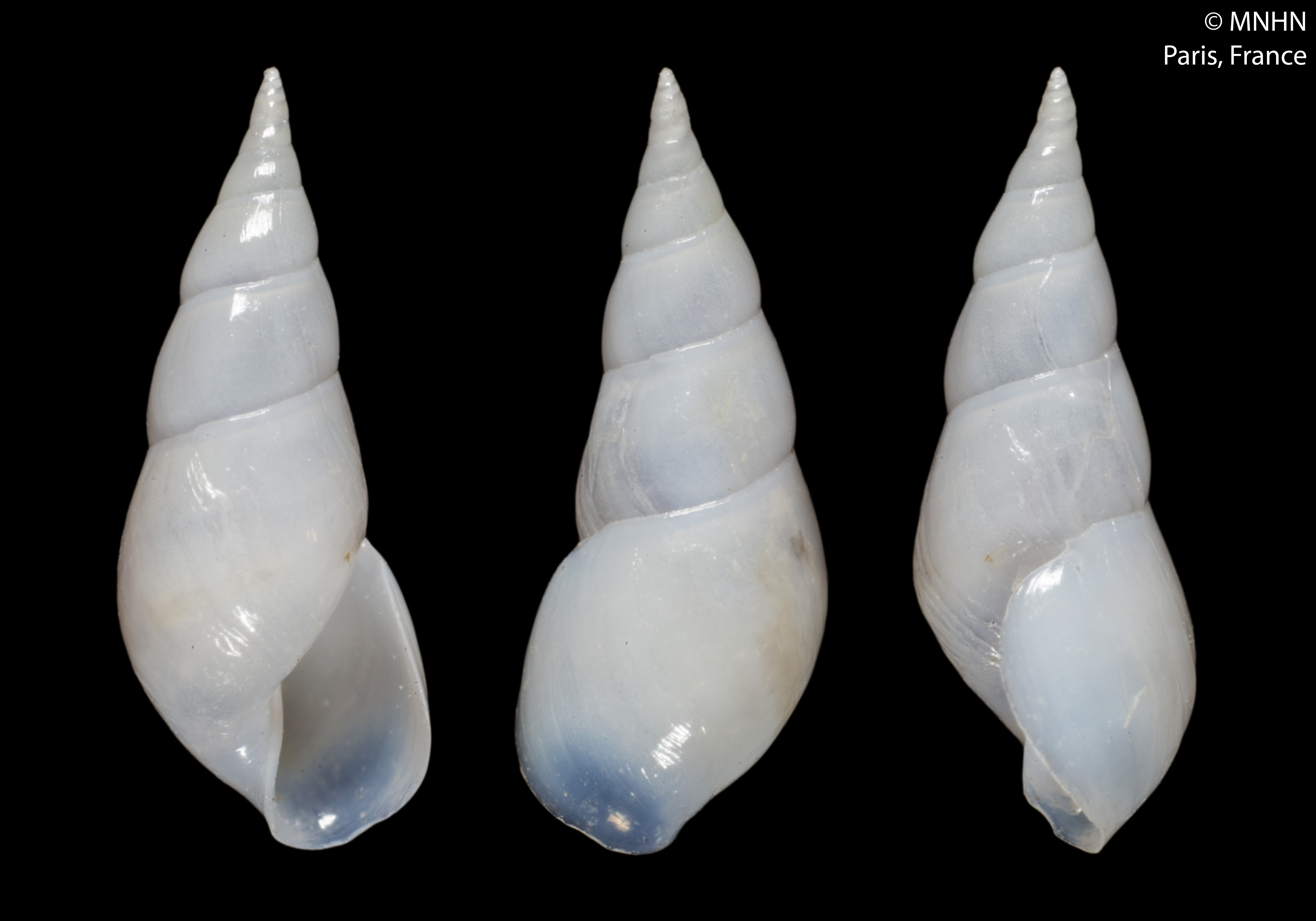
- Shell of Annulobalcis albus (holotype at MNHN, Paris)

Scientific classification
- Kingdom: Animalia
- Phylum: Mollusca
- Class: Gastropoda
- Subclass: Caenogastropoda
- Order: Littorinimorpha
- Family: Eulimidae
- Genus: Annulobalcis
- Species: A. albus

Binomial name
- Annulobalcis albus Dgebuadze, Fedosov & Kantor, 2012

= Annulobalcis albus =

Species of gastropod

Annulobalcis albus is a species of sea snail, a marine gastropod mollusc in the family Eulimidae.

== Distribution ==
This species is found off the coasts of Vietnam.
