= Stilifer concavus =

- Shell of Stilifer concavus (specimen at the Australian Museum)

Scientific classification
- Kingdom: Animalia
- Phylum: Mollusca
- Class: Gastropoda
- Subclass: Caenogastropoda
- Order: Littorinimorpha
- Family: Eulimidae
- Genus: Stilifer
- Species: S. concavus

Binomial name
- Stilifer concavus Warén, 1980

Species of gastropod

Stilifer concavus is a species of sea snail, a marine gastropod mollusk in the family Eulimidae. The species is one of a number within the genus Stilifer.

== Distribution ==
This marine species is endemic to Australia and occurs off Queensland
