= Apicalia angulata =

Scientific classification
- Kingdom: Animalia
- Phylum: Mollusca
- Class: Gastropoda
- Subclass: Caenogastropoda
- Order: Littorinimorpha
- Family: Eulimidae
- Genus: Apicalia
- Species: A. angulata

Binomial name
- Apicalia angulata Warén, 1981

Species of gastropod

Apicalia angulata is a species of sea snail, a marine gastropod mollusk in the family Eulimidae.

== Distribution ==
This marine species occurs in the South Pacific off Tonga and also off Australia (Queensland).
