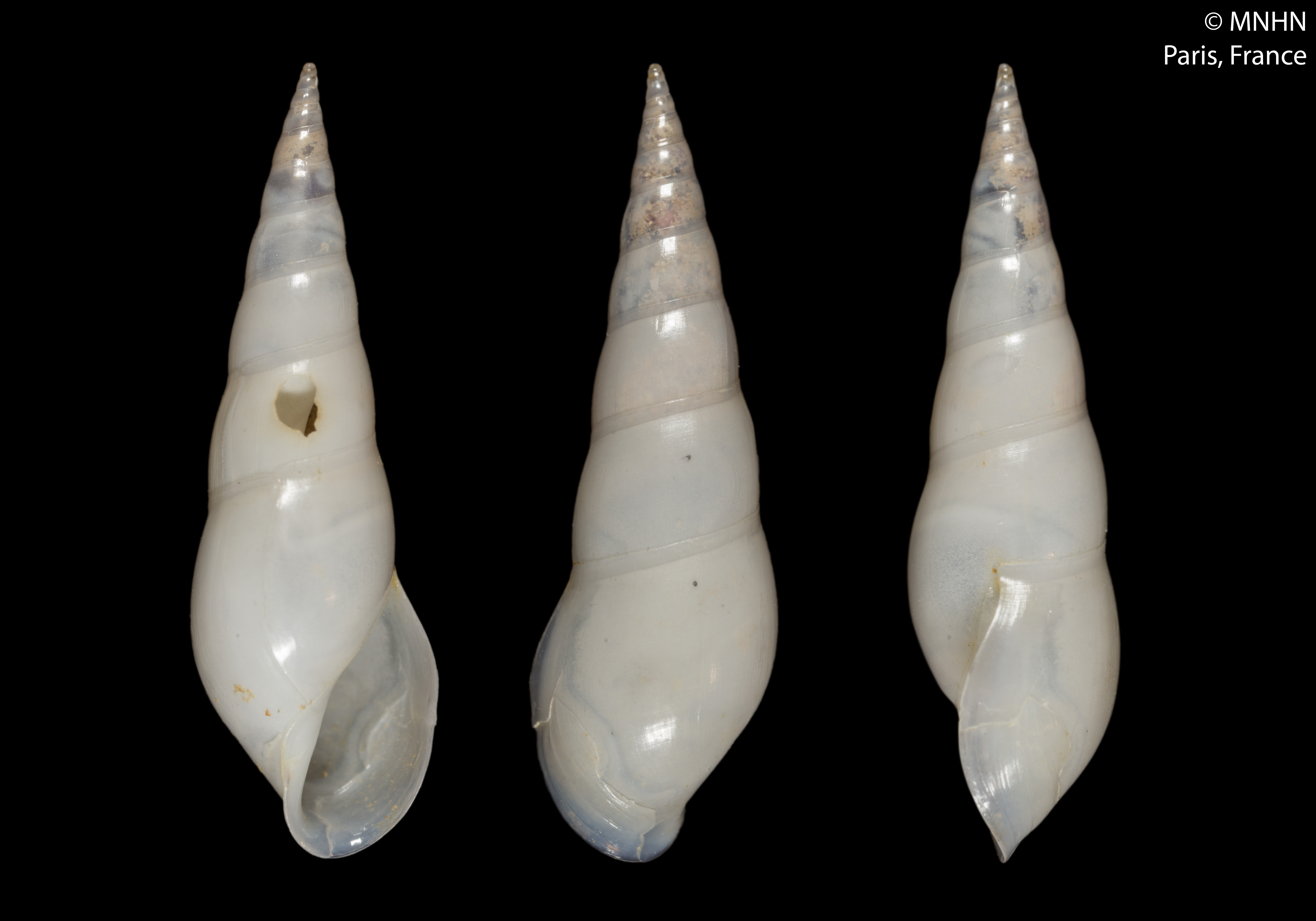
- Shell of Annulobalcis procera (holotype at MNHN, Paris)

Scientific classification
- Kingdom: Animalia
- Phylum: Mollusca
- Class: Gastropoda
- Subclass: Caenogastropoda
- Order: Littorinimorpha
- Family: Eulimidae
- Genus: Annulobalcis
- Species: A. procera

Binomial name
- Annulobalcis procera Simone, 2002

= Annulobalcis procera =

Species of gastropod

Annulobalcis procera is a species of sea snail, a marine gastropod mollusc in the family Eulimidae.

== Description ==
The maximum recorded shell length is 14.6 mm.

== Habitat ==
Minimum recorded depth is 61 m. Maximum recorded depth is 640 m.
