= Apicalia ovata =

Scientific classification
- Kingdom: Animalia
- Phylum: Mollusca
- Class: Gastropoda
- Subclass: Caenogastropoda
- Order: Littorinimorpha
- Family: Eulimidae
- Genus: Apicalia
- Species: A. ovata

Binomial name
- Apicalia ovata (Pease, 1861)

Synonyms
- Apicalia sandwichensis unaccepted (misspelling); Echineulima ovata (Pease, 1861); Eulima sandvichensis G. B. Sowerby II, 1865; Eulima sandwichensis unaccepted (misspelling); Mucronalia ovata Pease, 1861; Mucronalia sandvichensis (G. B. Sowerby II, 1865); Niso sandwichensis unaccepted (misspelling)

Species of gastropod

Apicalia ovata is a species of sea snail, a marine gastropod mollusk in the family Eulimidae.
