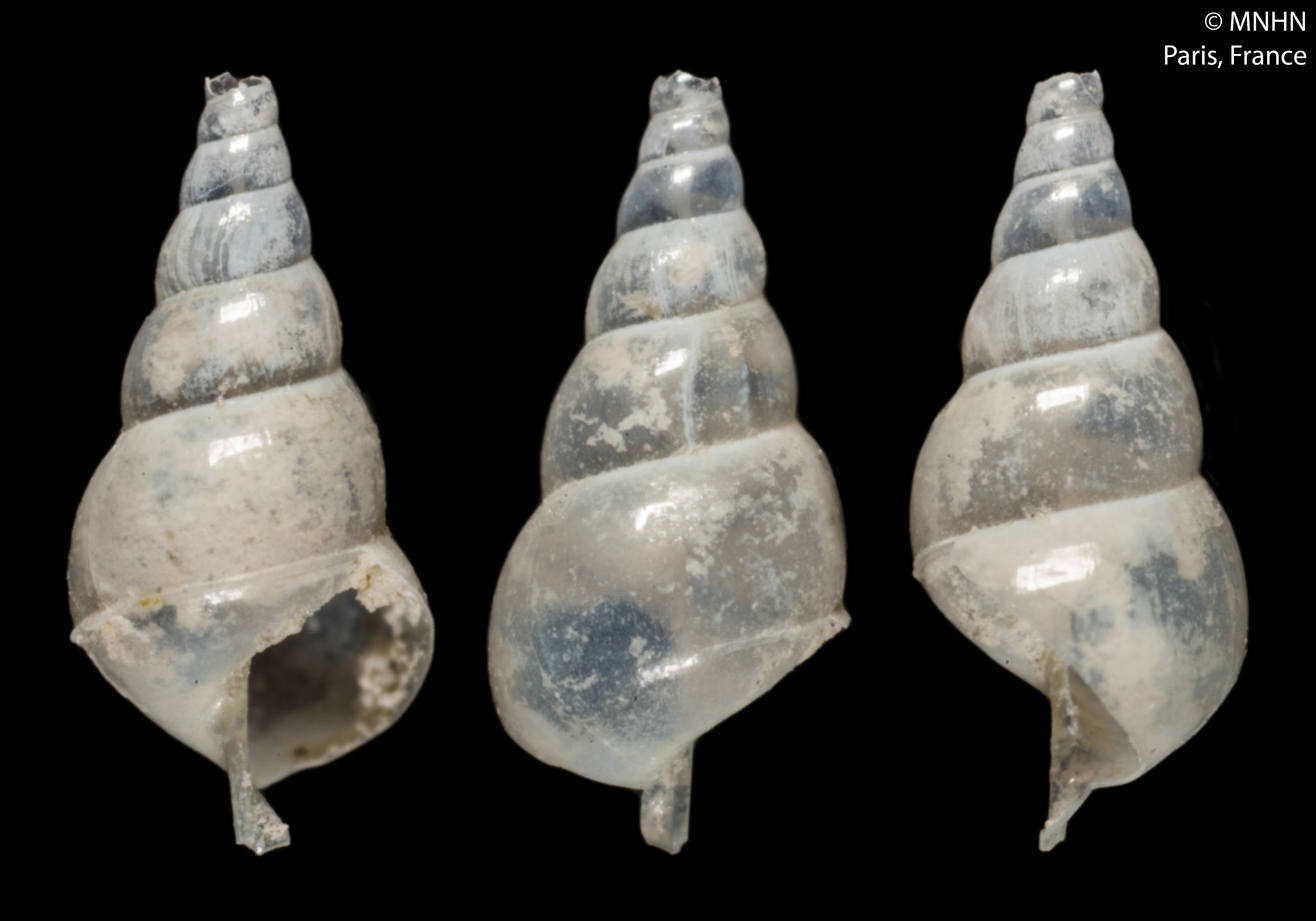
- Shell of Crinolamia angustispira (holotype at MNHN, Paris)

Scientific classification
- Kingdom: Animalia
- Phylum: Mollusca
- Class: Gastropoda
- Subclass: Caenogastropoda
- Order: Littorinimorpha
- Family: Eulimidae
- Genus: Crinolamia
- Species: C. angustispira

Binomial name
- Crinolamia angustispira Bouchet & Warén, 1986

= Crinolamia angustispira =

Species of gastropod

Crinolamia angustispira is a species of sea snail, a marine gastropod mollusk in the family Eulimidae.

== Description ==
The length of the shell attains 3 mm.

== Distribution ==
This species occurs in the following locations:

- European waters (ERMS scope) (Northeast Atlantic Ocean)
- United Kingdom Exclusive Economic Zone
