= Annulobalcis shimazui =

Scientific classification
- Kingdom: Animalia
- Phylum: Mollusca
- Class: Gastropoda
- Subclass: Caenogastropoda
- Order: Littorinimorpha
- Family: Eulimidae
- Genus: Annulobalcis
- Species: A. shimazui

Binomial name
- Annulobalcis shimazui Habe, 1965

Species of gastropod

Annulobalcis shimazui is a species of sea snail, a marine gastropod mollusc in the family Eulimidae.
