= Niso interrupta =

- Shell of Niso interrupta (specimen at the Smithsonian Institution)

Scientific classification
- Kingdom: Animalia
- Phylum: Mollusca
- Class: Gastropoda
- Subclass: Caenogastropoda
- Order: Littorinimorpha
- Family: Eulimidae
- Genus: Niso
- Species: N. interrupta

Binomial name
- Niso interrupta (G. B. Sowerby I, 1834)

Synonyms
- Bonellia interrupta (G. B. Sowerby I, 1834); Eulima interrupta G. B. Sowerby I, 1834

Species of gastropod

Niso interrupta is a species of micromollusk in the family Eulimidae.

Varieties

- Niso interrupta var. albida Dall, 1889: synonym of Niso albida Dall, 1889
- Niso interrupta var. circinata Dall, 1889: synonym of Niso circinata Dall, 1889
- Niso interrupta var. tricolor Dall, 1889: synonym of Niso tricolor Dall, 1889 (superseded rank)

== Description ==
The length of the shell (without the one and a half first whorl) attains 10.3 mm, its diameter 4.3 mm. It is one of the larger species in Niso known from the west coast of America.

(Original description) The shell is broadly elongate-conic, deeply and widely umbilicated. It is bluish-white, and polished, and it is marked with irregularly disposed varicial streaks of rust brown.

There are 13 whorls remaining in the holotype. The early whorls are well rounded, while the later ones are less rounded and slightly excurved at the appressed summit, marked by numerous lines of growth and exceedingly fine microscopic spiral striations. The summit of the whorls is appressed, falling a little below the angulated periphery of the preceding whorl, which causes the preceding whorl to appear as if it is slightly overhanging the suture. The periphery of the body whorl is angulated. The base is short, well rounded, and marked like the spire; the umbilicus is equal to about one-fifth of the greater diameter of the shell.

The aperture is oval, drawn out into an acute angle at the junction of the inner lip and the basal lip; the posterior angle is acute; the outer lip is thin; the inner lip is strongly curved and slightly revolute; and the parietal wall is covered by a thin callus.

== Distribution ==
The species occurs in the Pacific Ocean off the United States and Mexico (Baja California).
