= Niso antiselli =

- Shell of † Niso antiselli

Scientific classification
- Kingdom: Animalia
- Phylum: Mollusca
- Class: Gastropoda
- Subclass: Caenogastropoda
- Order: Littorinimorpha
- Family: Eulimidae
- Genus: Niso
- Species: †N. antiselli

Binomial name
- †Niso antiselli Anderson and Martin, 1914

Species of gastropod

Niso antiselli is an extinct species of micromollusk in the family Eulimidae.

== Description ==
The length of shell (apex broken) attains 7.5 mm, its diameter 4 mm.

(Original description) The shell is small and smooth, containing six whorls. The spire is conical, though the upper whorls are absent in the type specimen. The whorls are nearly flat, tapering toward the apex, and unsculptured. The suture is appressed. The body whorl is sharply angulated at the periphery. The base is convex, with a distinct umbilicus. The aperture is quadrate, and the outer lip is distinctly angulated, forming an angle of about 100°. The inner lip is thin and smooth. The umbilical opening is large, but it does not extend to the apex of the shell.

The placing of this species in the genus Niso is somewhat doubtful. The umbilical opening does not extend to the apex of the shell; it is, however, much more pronounced than in any of the Eulimidae or Pyramidellidae and has therefore been classed as a Niso

== Distribution ==
Fossils of the species were found in lower Miocene strata of eastern San Luis Obispo County, California.
