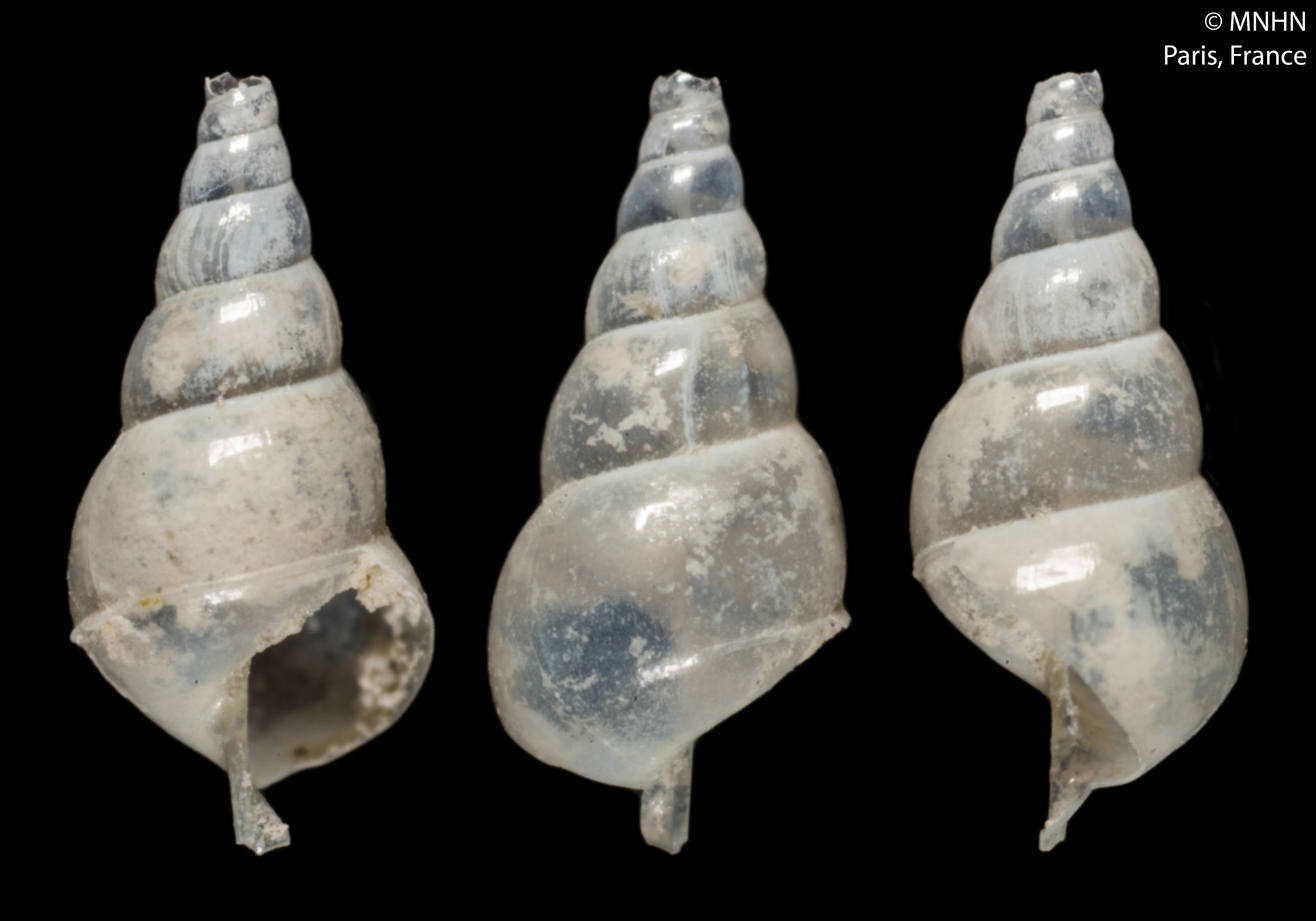
- Shell of Crinolamia angustispira

Scientific classification
- Kingdom: Animalia
- Phylum: Mollusca
- Class: Gastropoda
- Subclass: Caenogastropoda
- Order: Littorinimorpha
- Superfamily: Vanikoroidea
- Family: Eulimidae
- Genus: Crinolamia; Warén, 1979

Type species
- Crinolamia dahli Bouchet & Warén, 1979

= Crinolamia =

Genus of gastropods

Crinolamia is a genus of medium-sized sea snails, marine gastropod mollusks in the family Eulimidae.

== Species ==
The species within this genus include the following:

- Crinolamia angustispira (Bouchet & Warén, 1986)
- Crinolamia dahli (Bouchet & Warén, 1979)
- Crinolamia edwardiensis (Watson, 1880)
- Crinolamia kermadecensis (Knudsen, 1964)
- Crinolamia ptilocrinicola (Bartsch, 1907)
