= Niso imbricata =

- Shell of Niso imbricata (holotype at the Natural History Museum, London)

Scientific classification
- Kingdom: Animalia
- Phylum: Mollusca
- Class: Gastropoda
- Subclass: Caenogastropoda
- Order: Littorinimorpha
- Family: Eulimidae
- Genus: Niso
- Species: N. imbricata

Binomial name
- Niso imbricata (G. B. Sowerby I, 1834)

Synonyms
- Bonellia imbricata (G. B. Sowerby I, 1834) superseded combination; Eulima imbricata G. B. Sowerby I, 1834 (original combination); Niso (Neovolusia) imbricata (G. B. Sowerby I, 1834) alternative representation; Niso (Volusia) imbricata (G. B. Sowerby I, 1834) (preoccupied subgeneric name); Volusia imbricata (G. B. Sowerby I, 1834) (unaccepted combination)

Species of gastropod

Niso imbricata is a species of micromollusk in the family Eulimidae.

== Description ==
The length of shell attains 21 mm, its diameter 7.7 mm.

(Original description) The shell is acuminately pyramidal. It is whitish, and longitudinally lineated with light red. The shell contains 13 whorls. The whorls are angulated below and prominent. The umbilicus is small, and the aperture is anteriorly angulated.

== Distribution ==
The species occurs in the Pacific Ocean off Ecuador.
