= Annulobalcis yamamotoi =

Scientific classification
- Kingdom: Animalia
- Phylum: Mollusca
- Class: Gastropoda
- Subclass: Caenogastropoda
- Order: Littorinimorpha
- Family: Eulimidae
- Genus: Annulobalcis
- Species: A. yamaotoi

Binomial name
- Annulobalcis yamaotoi Habe, 1974

Species of gastropod

Annulobalcis yamamotoi is a species of medium-sized sea snail, a marine gastropod mollusc in the family Eulimidae.
