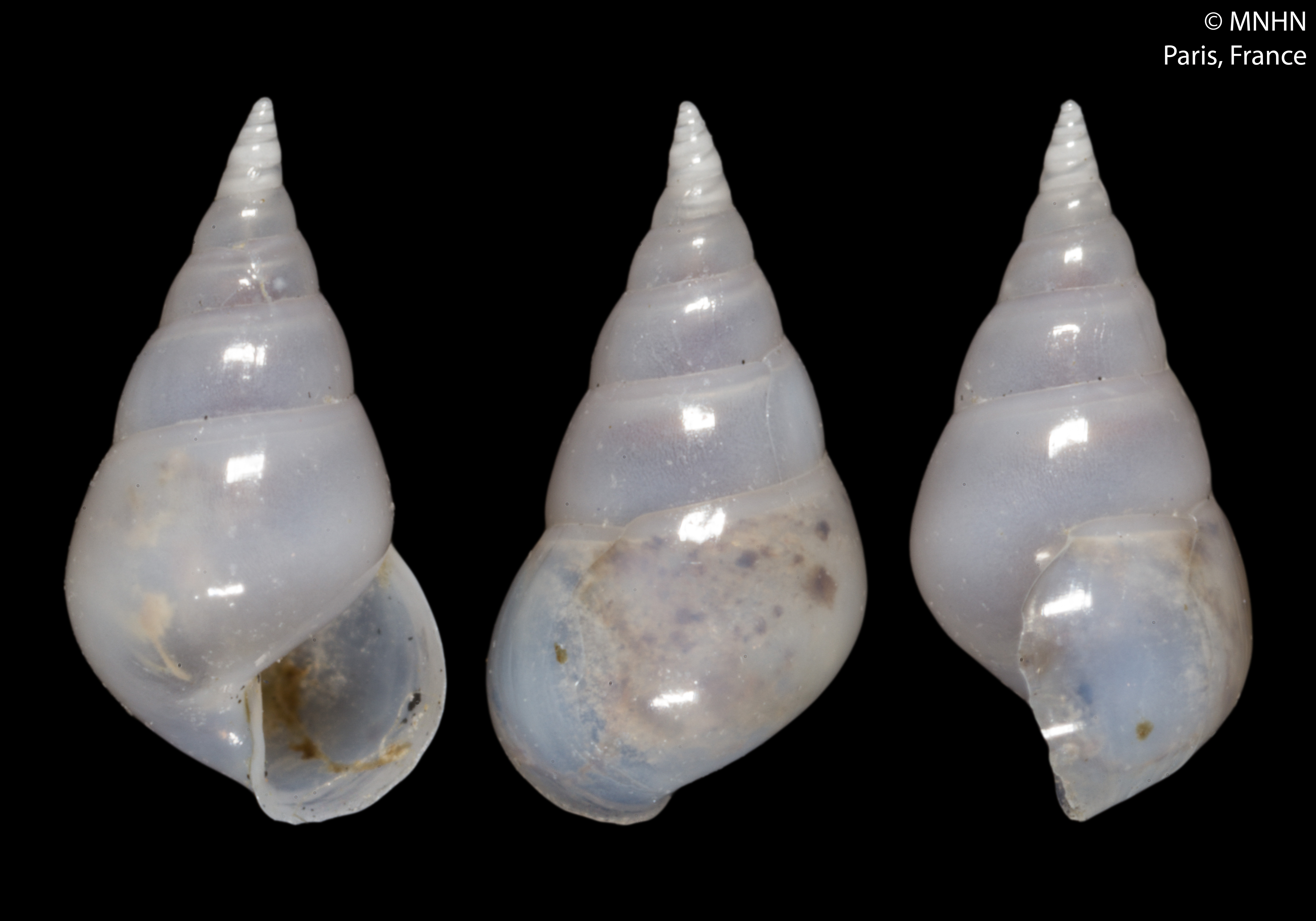
- Annulobalcis wareni

Scientific classification
- Kingdom: Animalia
- Phylum: Mollusca
- Class: Gastropoda
- Subclass: Caenogastropoda
- Order: Littorinimorpha
- Superfamily: Vanikoroidea
- Family: Eulimidae
- Genus: Annulobalcis; Habe, 1965

Type species
- Annulobalcis shimazui Habe, 1965

= Annulobalcis =

Genus of gastropods

Annulobalcis is a genus of medium-sized sea snails, marine gastropod molluscs in the family Eulimidae.

== Species ==
There are eleven known species within the genus Annulobalcis:

- Annulobalcis albus Dgebuadze, Fedosov & Kantor, 2012
- Annulobalcis aurisflamma Simone & Martins, 1995
- Annulobalcis cicatricosa (Warén, 1981)
- Annulobalcis maculatus Dgebuadze, Fedosov & Kantor, 2012
- Annulobalcis marshalli Warén, 1981
- Annulobalcis pellucida (Turton, 1832)
- Annulobalcis procera Simone, 2002
- Annulobalcis shimazui Habe, 1965
- Annulobalcis vinarius Dgebuadze, Fedosov & Kantor, 2012
- Annulobalcis wareni Dgebuadze, Fedosov & Kantor, 2012
- Annulobalcis yamamotoi Habe, 1974

Species brought into synonymy

- Annulobalcis prionocidaricola Habe, 1974: synonym of Trochostilifer straitus (Hedley, 1905)
