= Annulobalcis aurisflamma =

Scientific classification
- Kingdom: Animalia
- Phylum: Mollusca
- Class: Gastropoda
- Subclass: Caenogastropoda
- Order: Littorinimorpha
- Family: Eulimidae
- Genus: Annulobalcis
- Species: A. aurisflamma

Binomial name
- Annulobalcis aurisflamma Simone & Martins, 1995

Species of gastropod

Annulobalcis aurisflamma is a species of sea snail, a marine gastropod mollusc in the family Eulimidae.

== Description ==
The maximum recorded shell length is 11 mm.

== Habitat ==
Minimum recorded depth is 0 m. Maximum recorded depth is 8 m.
