= Stilifer utinomii =

Scientific classification
- Kingdom: Animalia
- Phylum: Mollusca
- Class: Gastropoda
- Subclass: Caenogastropoda
- Order: Littorinimorpha
- Family: Eulimidae
- Genus: Stilifer
- Species: S. utinomii

Binomial name
- Stilifer utinomii Habe, 1951

Synonyms
- Stilifer ophidiastericola T. Habe, 1951 (junior subjective synonym); Stilifer utinoumi Habe, T. 1951

Species of gastropod

Stilifer utinomii is a species of sea snail, a marine gastropod mollusk in the family Eulimidae. The species is one of a number within the genus Stilifer.

== Distribution ==
This species occurs in the Western Pacific; also off Australia (Queensland)
