= Sabinella meridionalis =

- Shell of Sabinella meridionalis (original image)

Scientific classification
- Kingdom: Animalia
- Phylum: Mollusca
- Class: Gastropoda
- Subclass: Caenogastropoda
- Order: Littorinimorpha
- Family: Eulimidae
- Genus: Sabinella
- Species: S. meridionalis

Binomial name
- Sabinella meridionalis Bartsch, 1917

Species of gastropod

Sabinella meridionalis is a species of sea snail, a marine gastropod mollusk in the family Eulimidae.

== Description ==
The length of the shell attains 3.9 mm, its diameter 1.3 mm.

(Original description) The small shell is bluish-white and polished. It is marked by exceedingly fine lines of growth only. There are only five whorls remaining in the examined species but they are so distinct from any other that the species will readily be recognized by them. The early whorls are decollated, while the later ones are well rounded and separated by a moderately compressed suture. The periphery of the body whorl is well rounded; the base is moderately long and well rounded. The aperture is very broadly oval; the posterior angle is acute; the outer lip is thin and decidedly protracted in the middle between the posterior angle and the base; the inner lip is slender, curved, and reflected over and partly appressed to the base posteriorly; and the parietal wall is covered by a thin callus.

== Distribution ==
This species occurs off the Galápagos Islands.
