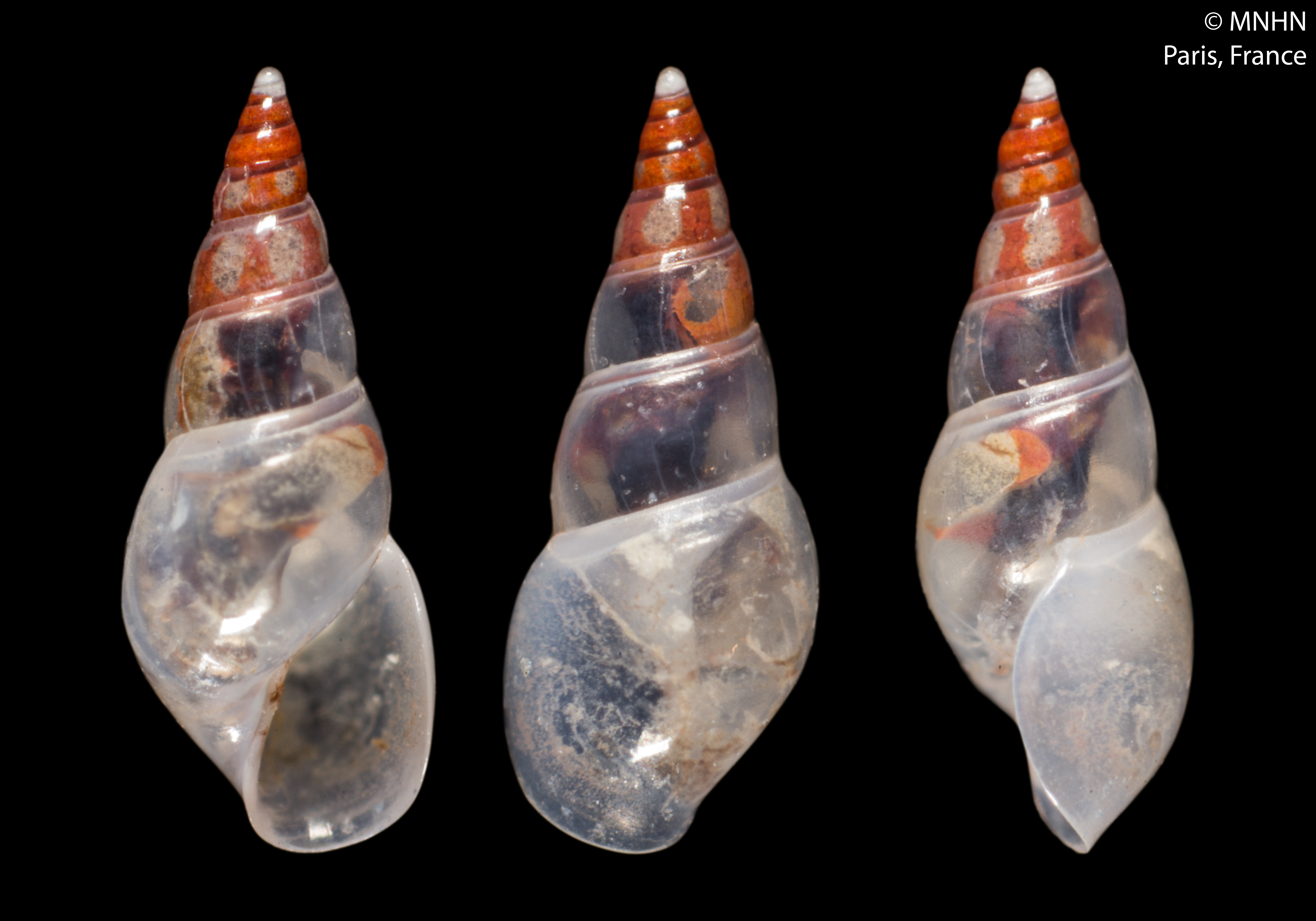
- Shell of Annulobalcis vinarius (holotype at MNHN, Paris)

Scientific classification
- Kingdom: Animalia
- Phylum: Mollusca
- Class: Gastropoda
- Subclass: Caenogastropoda
- Order: Littorinimorpha
- Family: Eulimidae
- Genus: Annulobalcis
- Species: A. vinarius

Binomial name
- Annulobalcis vinarius Dgebuadze, Fedosov & Kantor, 2012

= Annulobalcis vinarius =

Species of gastropod

Annulobalcis vinarius is a species of medium-sized sea snail, a marine gastropod mollusc in the family of Eulimidae.

== Distribution ==
This marine species remains distributed throughout marine terrain, off the coasts of Vietnam.
