= Stilifer pisum =

Scientific classification
- Kingdom: Animalia
- Phylum: Mollusca
- Class: Gastropoda
- Subclass: Caenogastropoda
- Order: Littorinimorpha
- Family: Eulimidae
- Genus: Stilifer
- Species: S. pisum

Binomial name
- Stilifer pisum Habe, 1953

Synonyms
- Robillardia pisum (Habe, 1953) ·

Species of gastropod

Stilifer pisum is a species of sea snail, a marine gastropod mollusk in the family Eulimidae. The species is one of a number within the genus Stilifer.

== Distribution ==
This marine species occurs off Japan and Oman.
