= Stilifer ovoideus =

Scientific classification
- Kingdom: Animalia
- Phylum: Mollusca
- Class: Gastropoda
- Subclass: Caenogastropoda
- Order: Littorinimorpha
- Family: Eulimidae
- Genus: Stilifer
- Species: S. ovoideus

Binomial name
- Stilifer ovoideus H. Adams & A. Adams, 1853

Synonyms
- Stylifer ovoideus A. Adams, 1853 (incorrect original spelling of genus name)

Species of gastropod

Stilifer ovoideus is a species of sea snail, a marine gastropod mollusk in the family Eulimidae. The species is one of a number within the genus Stilifer.

== Distribution ==
This species occurs in the Red Sea off Saudi Arabia.
