= Echineulima thaanumi =

Scientific classification
- Kingdom: Animalia
- Phylum: Mollusca
- Class: Gastropoda
- Subclass: Caenogastropoda
- Order: Littorinimorpha
- Family: Eulimidae
- Genus: Echineulima
- Species: E. thaanumi

Binomial name
- Echineulima thaanumi Pilsbry, 1921

Synonyms
- Stylifer thaanumi Pilsbry, 1921

Species of gastropod

Echineulima thaanumi is a species of sea snail, a marine gastropod mollusk in the family Eulimidae.

== Distribution ==
This marine species mainly occurs around the Hawaiian Islands.
