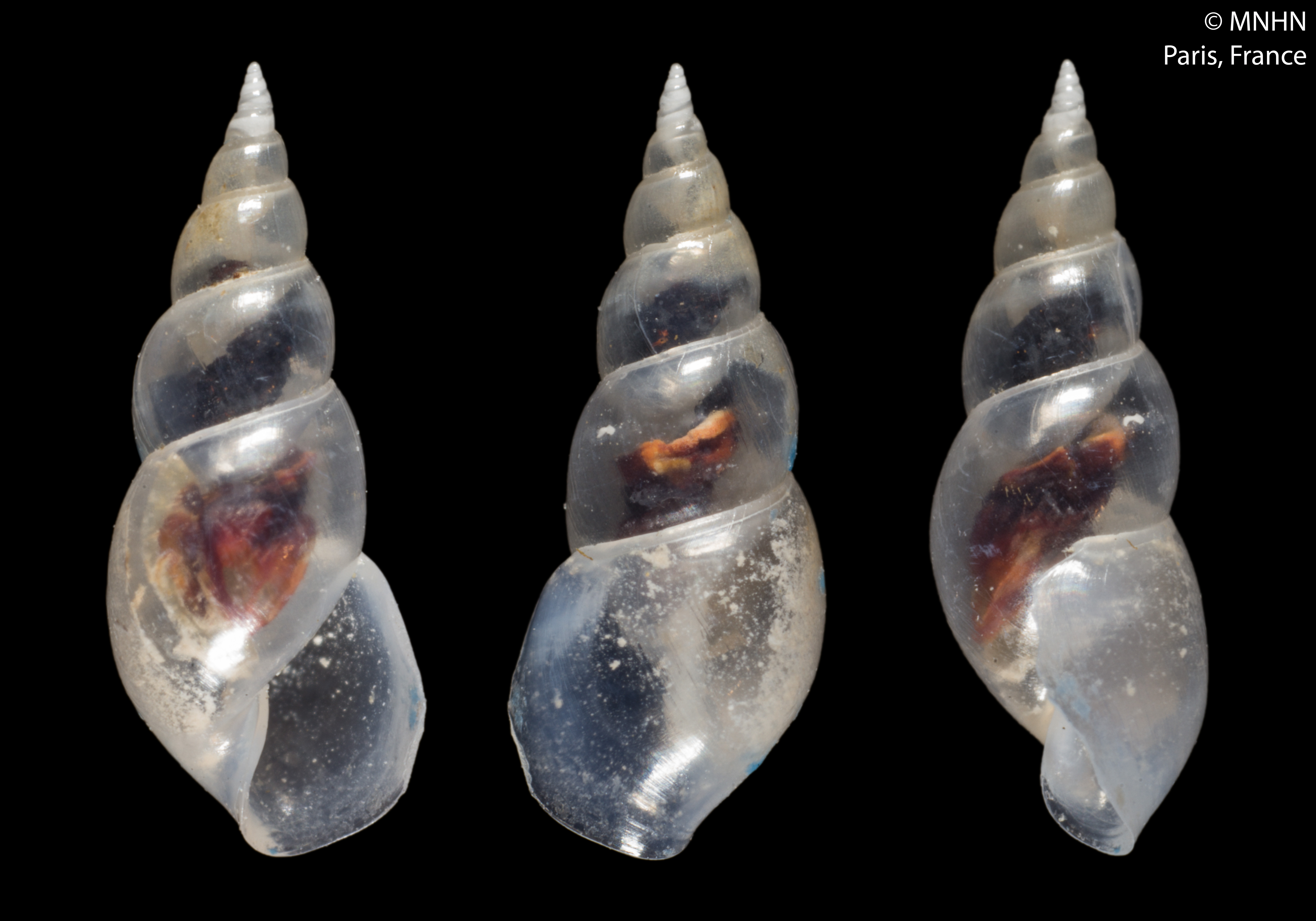
- Shell of Annulobalcis maculatus (holotype at MNHN, Paris)

Scientific classification
- Kingdom: Animalia
- Phylum: Mollusca
- Class: Gastropoda
- Subclass: Caenogastropoda
- Order: Littorinimorpha
- Family: Eulimidae
- Genus: Annulobalcis
- Species: A. maculatus

Binomial name
- Annulobalcis maculatus Dgebuadze, Fedosov & Kantor, 2012

= Annulobalcis maculatus =

Species of gastropod

Annulobalcis maculatus is a species of sea snail, a marine gastropod mollusc in the family Eulimidae.

== Distribution ==
This marine species is found off the coast of Vietnam.
