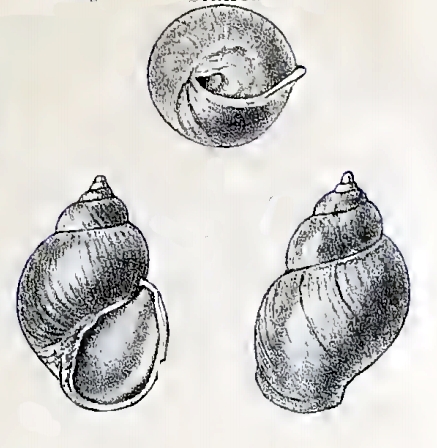
- Drawing with three views of a shell of Goodingia varicosa

Scientific classification
- Kingdom: Animalia
- Phylum: Mollusca
- Class: Gastropoda
- Subclass: Caenogastropoda
- Order: Littorinimorpha
- Family: Eulimidae
- Genus: Goodingia; Lützen, 1972

= Goodingia =

Genus of gastropods

Goodingia is a genus of sea snails, marine gastropod mollusks in the family Eulimidae. They are crinoid-parasitic.

== Species ==
There are two known species within this genus of gastropods, these include the following:

- Goodingia capillastericola (Minichev, 1970)
- Goodingia ophiuraphila (Habe, 1974)
- Goodingia varicosa (Schepman, 1909)
