= Echineulima ovata =

Scientific classification
- Kingdom: Animalia
- Phylum: Mollusca
- Class: Gastropoda
- Subclass: Caenogastropoda
- Order: Littorinimorpha
- Family: Eulimidae
- Genus: Echineulima
- Species: E. ovata

Binomial name
- Echineulima ovata Pease, 1861

Synonyms
- Mucronalia ovata Pease, 1861

Species of gastropod

Echineulima ovata is a species of sea snail, a marine gastropod mollusk in the family Eulimidae.
