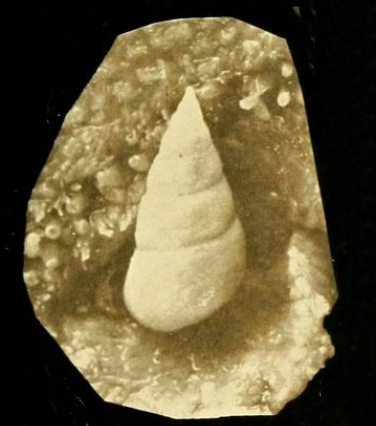
- Apicalia palmipedis on a starfish of the genus Anseropoda

Scientific classification
- Kingdom: Animalia
- Phylum: Mollusca
- Class: Gastropoda
- Subclass: Caenogastropoda
- Order: Littorinimorpha
- Family: Eulimidae
- Genus: Apicalia
- Species: A. palmipedis

Binomial name
- Apicalia palmipedis Koehler & Vaney, 1913

Synonyms
- Murconalia palmipedis Koehler & Vaney, 1913

= Apicalia palmipedis =

Species of gastropod

Apicalia palmipedis is a species of sea snail, a marine gastropod mollusk in the family Eulimidae.

== Description ==
(Original description in French) The shell reaches 6.5 mm in height. It has eight whorls and its apex terminates in a small mucro with a blunt tip. This shell is thick and whitish and is not covered by a pseudopallium. The operculum is horny.

This species was embedded in the plates of an interradius of a sea star (Anseropoda Nardo, 1834). The visceral region offers only a small number of whorls. At the base of the spire, there is the mantle, below which protrude two very well-developed tentacles; we do not perceive any eye spots. Behind this cephalic region, a very reduced foot is distinguishable, bearing a small horny operculum on its dorsal surface. Between the foot and the tentacular region, an enormous cylindrical proboscis arises, whose length reaches 7 mm, and which is consequently larger than the height of the visceral spire; its diameter is approximately one millimeter and its wall appears to be equipped with very strong musculature. At a certain distance from its base, and below the foot and tentacles, the proboscis is equipped with a truncated conical collar that completely surrounds it. This collar, more or less membranous, represents a poorly developed pseudopallium, which, when fully expanded in the living animal, does not reach or could barely cover the base of the shell.

== Distribution ==
This marine species occurs off Singapore.
