= Echineulima leucophaes =

Scientific classification
- Kingdom: Animalia
- Phylum: Mollusca
- Class: Gastropoda
- Subclass: Caenogastropoda
- Order: Littorinimorpha
- Family: Eulimidae
- Genus: Echineulima
- Species: E. leucophaes

Binomial name
- Echineulima leucophaes Tomlin & Shackleford, 1913

Synonyms
- Mucronalia leucophaes Tomlin & Shackleford, 1913

Species of gastropod

Echineulima leucophaes is a species of sea snail, a marine gastropod mollusk in the family Eulimidae.

== Description ==
The shell is rather large compared to other species within the family Eulimidae, with the average specimen measuring approximately 10 mm in length.
