= Echineulima paulucciae =

Scientific classification
- Kingdom: Animalia
- Phylum: Mollusca
- Class: Gastropoda
- Subclass: Caenogastropoda
- Order: Littorinimorpha
- Family: Eulimidae
- Genus: Echineulima
- Species: E. paulucciae

Binomial name
- Echineulima paulucciae P. Fischer, 1864

Synonyms
- Echineulima palucciae P. Fischer, 1864; misspelling; Stilifer palucciae P. Fischer, 1864; Stylifer paulucciae P. Fischer, 1864

Species of gastropod

Echineulima paulucciae is a species of sea snail, a marine gastropod mollusk in the family Eulimidae.
