= Crinolamia ptilocrinicola =

- Shell of Crinolamia ptilocrinicola

Scientific classification
- Kingdom: Animalia
- Phylum: Mollusca
- Class: Gastropoda
- Subclass: Caenogastropoda
- Order: Littorinimorpha
- Family: Eulimidae
- Genus: Crinolamia
- Species: C. ptilocrinicola

Binomial name
- Crinolamia ptilocrinicola Bartsch, 1907

Synonyms
- Eulima ptilocrinicola Bartsch, 1907 (original combination); Sabinella ptilocrinicola Bartsch, 1907

Species of gastropod

Crinolamia ptilocrinicola is a species of sea snail, a marine gastropod mollusc in the family Eulimidae.

== Description ==
The length of the shell attains 9.5 mm, its diameter 3.9 mm.

The thin shell is elongate-conic, polished, transparent, and tinged with bluish-white (with the dried animal showing through the upper whorls as a granular, golden-yellow mass). The 11 whorls increase regularly in size; they are decidedly rounded, with the surface weakly malleated, and have a few feebly developed varices that appear at irregular intervals as narrow, opaque, vertical bands. The summit of each whorl is closely appressed to the preceding whorl, with the extreme edge forming a slender, spiral sutural band. The body whorl is quite strongly inflated basally. The periphery and base are well rounded and marked like the spire. The aperture is moderately large and suboval; the outer lip is thin and evenly curved; the inner lip is slender, vertical, and slightly reflected; and the parietal wall is covered by a thin callus. The operculum is thin and corneous.

== Distribution ==
This species occurs in the Pacific Ocean off Canada and the USA.
