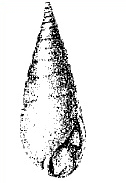
- Shell of Melanella aethria (original drawing)

Scientific classification
- Kingdom: Animalia
- Phylum: Mollusca
- Class: Gastropoda
- Subclass: Caenogastropoda
- Order: Littorinimorpha
- Family: Eulimidae
- Genus: Melanella
- Species: M. aethria

Binomial name
- Melanella aethria Melvill, 1918

Synonyms
- Mucronalia aethria Melvill, 1918

= Melanella aethria =

Species of gastropod

Melanella aethria is a species of sea snail, a marine gastropod mollusk in the family Eulimidae. The species is one of many species known to exist within the genus, Melanella.

== Description ==
The length of the shell attains 5 mm, its diameter 1.5 mm.

(Original description in Latin) This is a small shell, very slightly translucent, and extremely glossy, with an elongated, spindle-shaped form; it has up to twelve whorls. The two apical whorls are simply heterostrophic; the next three are slender and tail-like, while the remaining whorls are scarcely impressed at the sutures and increase gently in size. The body whorl is approximately equal in length to the three preceding whorls taken together. The peristome is thin, the columella oblique, and the aperture ovate-oblong.

== Distribution ==
This species occurs in the Persian Gulf
