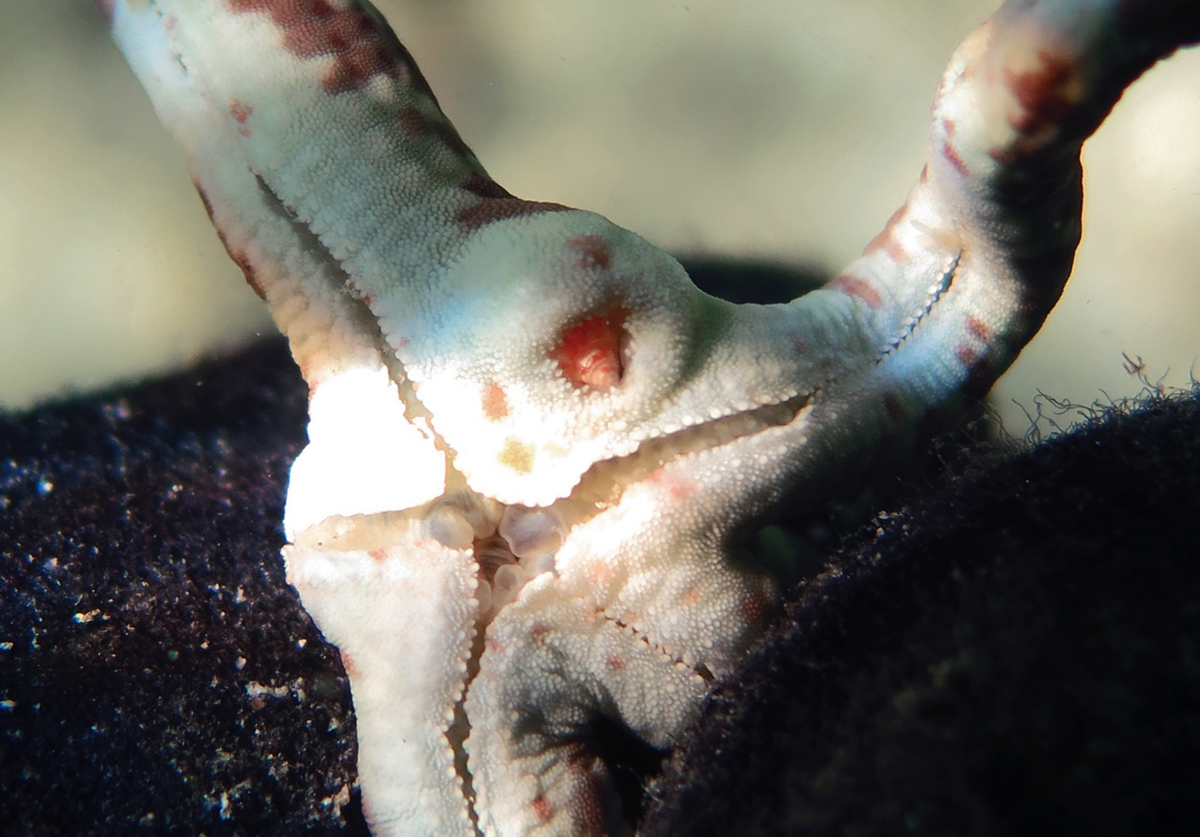
- Stilifer linckiae parasitizing Lickia multifora

Scientific classification
- Kingdom: Animalia
- Phylum: Mollusca
- Class: Gastropoda
- Subclass: Caenogastropoda
- Order: Littorinimorpha
- Family: Eulimidae
- Genus: Stilifer
- Species: S. linckiae

Binomial name
- Stilifer linckiae P. Sarasin & F. Sarasin, 1887

Synonyms
- Stylifer linckiae Sarasin.

= Stilifer linckiae =

Species of gastropod

Stilifer linckiae is a species of sea snail, a marine gastropod mollusk in the family Eulimidae. The species is one of a number within the genus Stilifer.

== Distribution ==
It is found in the Indo-Pacific (Mascarene basin); also off Australia (Queensland).
