= Sabinella opalina =

- Shell of Sabinella opalina

Scientific classification
- Kingdom: Animalia
- Phylum: Mollusca
- Class: Gastropoda
- Subclass: Caenogastropoda
- Order: Littorinimorpha
- Family: Eulimidae
- Genus: Sabinella
- Species: S. opalina

Binomial name
- Sabinella opalina (de Folin, 1867)

Synonyms
- Eulima opalina de Folin, 1867 superseded combination; Melanella opalina (de Folin, 1867) superseded combination

Species of gastropod

Sabinella opalina is a species of sea snail, a marine gastropod mollusk in the family Eulimidae.

== Description ==
(Original description) The imperforate shell is rather elongate. It is opaque, shining, opaline, and darkly spotted with red. The spire is conic, attenuated, and tapering to a subacute apex. The 10 whorls increase slowly in diameter and are united by a simple suture; the body whorl is equal to one-third the altitude of the entire shell and is strongly depressed at the base. The aperture is subquadrate, the margin is slightly thickened, and the columella is reflected.

== Distribution ==
This species occurs off Negritos Islands Biological Reserve, Costa Rica.
