= Melanella variabilis =

- Shell of Melanella variabilis (original image)

Scientific classification
- Kingdom: Animalia
- Phylum: Mollusca
- Class: Gastropoda
- Subclass: Caenogastropoda
- Order: Littorinimorpha
- Family: Eulimidae
- Genus: Melanella
- Species: M. variabilis

Binomial name
- Melanella variabilis (Schepman & Nierstrasz, 1914)

Synonyms
- Mucronalia variabilis Schepman & Nierstrasz, 1914 (original combination)

Species of gastropod

Melanella variabilis is a species of sea snail, a marine gastropod mollusk in the family Eulimidae. The species is one of many species known to exist within the genus, Melanella.

== Description ==
The height of the shell attains 4½ mm; its diameter 1½ mm; the height of the aperture 1.4 mm; diameter 1½ mm. Height of the body whorl, in apertural view, ¾ mm; that of the penultimate whorl, 1½ mm.

(Original description in German) The shell is very elongately oval, smooth, shining, and rather translucent. It has almost no sculpture except for a few widely spaced radial striae on the whorls and a distinct striation in the umbilical region.

There are five whorls, of which the first two to 2½ form the slender, stalk-like apex. These nuclear whorls are convex. Of the remaining whorls, two or three are still somewhat convex, while the lower ones are almost flat. The body whorl is extremely weakly constricted below the suture. In accordance with this, the sutures are distinctly impressed in the uppermost whorls, but further down they are visible only as a fine line.

The shell also appears to be internally marginated beneath the suture; at any rate, the individual whorls show a subsutural zone that is more translucent in a dry shell. This zone appears to result from the whorls being pressed closely against the whorl above them. The body whorl is narrowed below.

The aperture is ovate, with a sharp angle above and a regularly rounded margin below. In frontal view, it is very oblique to the shell axis. The free margin of the aperture is slightly protruding near the middle and is convex below; it is not sharp and bears a thin enamel-like ridge internally. The concave columellar margin forms a fine ridge on the left wall of the aperture.

The operculum is horny, thin, and paucispiral.

== Distribution ==
This species occurs in the Indian Ocean off Zanzibar.
