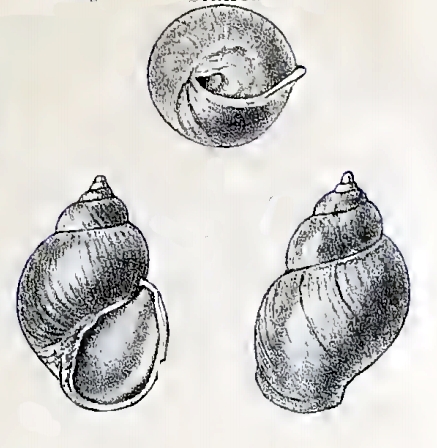
- Original drawing with three views of a shell of Goodingia varicosa

Scientific classification
- Kingdom: Animalia
- Phylum: Mollusca
- Class: Gastropoda
- Subclass: Caenogastropoda
- Order: Littorinimorpha
- Family: Eulimidae
- Genus: Goodingia
- Species: G. varicosa

Binomial name
- Goodingia varicosa (Schepman, 1909à

Synonyms
- Mucronalia varicosa Schepman, 1909

= Goodingia varicosa =

Species of gastropod

Goodingia varicosa is a species of sea snail, a marine gastropod mollusk in the family Eulimidae. This species, along with Goodingia capillastericola, belongs in the genus Goodingia. They are crinoid-parasitic.

== Habitat ==
This marine species occurs off Papua New Guinea.

== Description ==
The shell of this species is small, measuring 4 mm in length and between 2.5 and 2.75 mm in width, with a white, oval appearance that lacks holes. Its surface is mainly smooth but has very fine lines and some rib-like marks on the last part of the shell. It consists of around six rounded sections, with the first two being pointed at the tip. The opening of the shell is oval-shaped with a thin edge, and the side near the hinge is slightly curved and thickened at the base. A thin, horn-like covering is present at the shell's opening. Its shell is less round than G. capillastericola.
