= Sabinella troglodytes =

Scientific classification
- Kingdom: Animalia
- Phylum: Mollusca
- Class: Gastropoda
- Subclass: Caenogastropoda
- Order: Littorinimorpha
- Family: Eulimidae
- Genus: Sabinella
- Species: S. troglodytes

Binomial name
- Sabinella troglodytes (Thiele, 1925)

Synonyms
- Eulima troglodytes Thiele, 1925; Mucronalia nidorum Pilsbry, 1956; Sabinella nidorum (Pilsbry, 1956)

Species of gastropod

Sabinella troglodytes is a species of small sea snail, a marine gastropod mollusk in the family Eulimidae. It is a parasitic snail found near the coast of Brazil which lives on the body of the slate pencil urchin Eucidaris tribuloides.

== Description ==
The shell measures 3.75 mm in height and 1.9 mm in diameter, while the height of the aperture is 1.7 mm.

(Original description in German) Under peculiar circumstances, the German South Polar Expedition (1901-1903) found four animals of this species south of the Cape Verde Islands. They were attached within a cavity in a spine of the urchin Eucidaris tribuloides (Lamarck). This spine shows a swelling 7–8 mm in diameter, which is hollow and opens through a hole 3.5 mm wide; in addition to the four snails, it contained several small clusters of eggs.

I (J. Thiele) cannot state anything definite about the origin of this structure; it remains unclear whether it was produced by the snails. The animals display the characters of Eulima and cannot properly be described as parasitic.

The shell is somewhat irregularly conical, white, and slightly translucent. It consists of eight convex whorls that increase slowly at first and then rather rapidly. The apex is pointed, and below, from a rounded edge onwards, the shell is flattened. The columellar margin is fairly broad and weakly curved. The outer margin is rather strongly produced in a rounded curve in its upper part. The aperture is large and irregularly pyriform, somewhat angular on both sides below, and sharply angled above. A distinct growth check runs half a whorl away from the apertural margin.

This peculiar species shows some resemblance to the Australian Eulima munita Hedley, 1903  (synonym of Sabinella munita (Hedley, 1903))(Mem. Austral. Mus., vol. 4, p. 358, text‑fig. 81). [3].

== Distribution ==
Distribution of Sabinella troglodytes include near the coast of Brazil.

== Description ==
The maximum recorded shell length is 4.1 mm.

== Habitat ==
Minimum recorded depth is 1 m. Maximum recorded depth is 46 m.

== Feeding habits ==
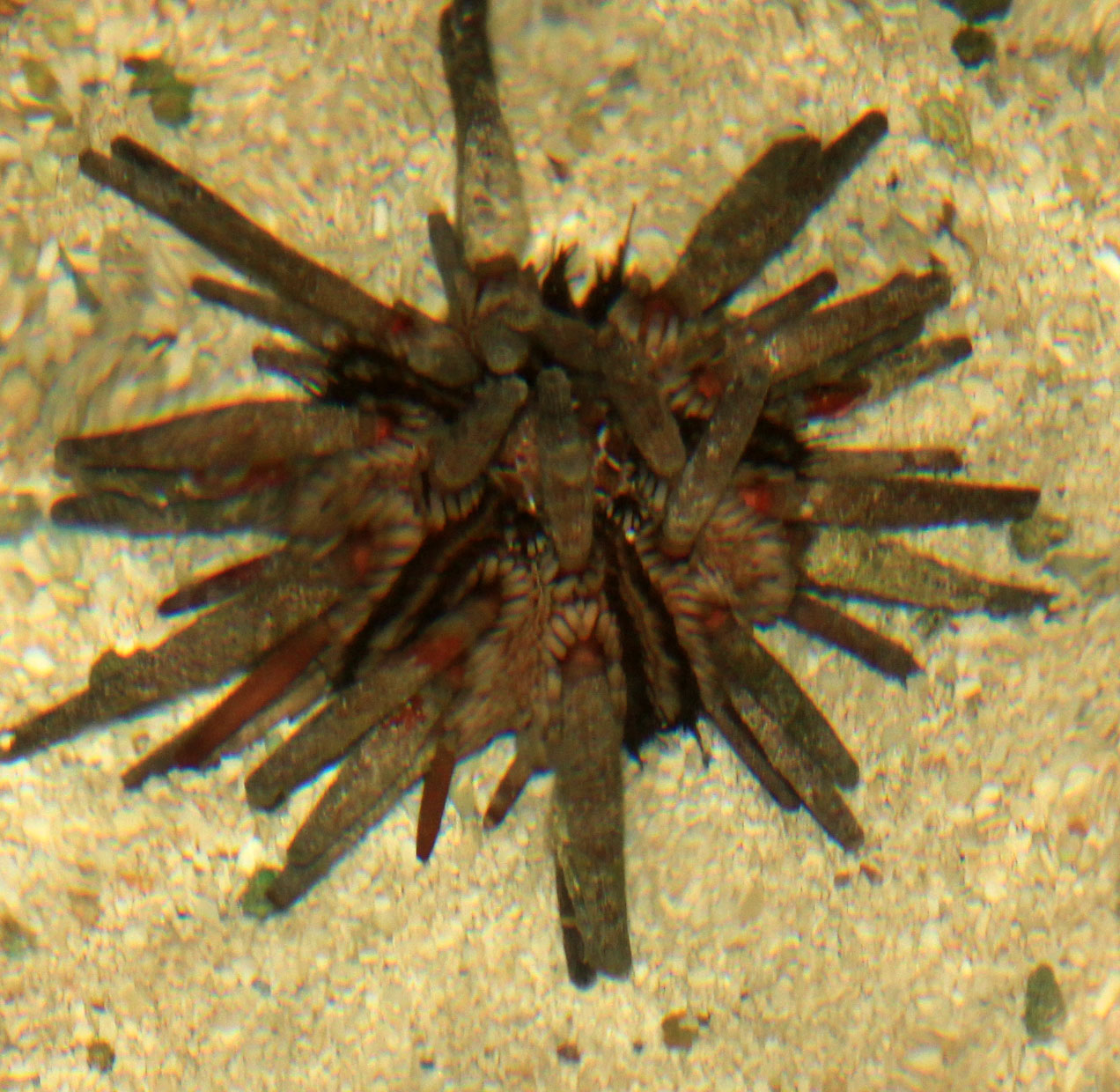
Eucidaris tribuloides is a host of Sabinella troglodytes

S. troglodytes feed and live on the spines of sea urchins. It lives on the body of the slate pencil urchin Eucidaris tribuloides. Unlike most of its gastropod relatives, S. troglodyte has lost its radula so they gain access to all that soft internal spine tissue of a sea urchin by secreting some kind of corrosive substance that eats through the tough walls of the spine. This parasitic snail is not content to simply just feed on the sea urchin, they also alter the urchin's spines to make it a more comfortable home. Sabinella troglodytes is one of many species of gall-forming snails that parasitize echinoderms. It is currently unknown how S. troglodytes alters the sea urchin's spines, but it could be due to some other components in the snail's saliva. In addition to a corrosive agent to erode the sea urchin's spine, it might also be spitting out growth factors that alter the tissue of the spine. In addition to being a cozy place to feed and hide from threats, these galls seem to be a bit of a love nest for S. troglodytes during the summer months.
