= Monogamus barronii =

Scientific classification
- Kingdom: Animalia
- Phylum: Mollusca
- Class: Gastropoda
- Subclass: Caenogastropoda
- Order: Littorinimorpha
- Family: Eulimidae
- Genus: Monogamus
- Species: M. barronii

Binomial name
- Monogamus barronii (A. Adams, 1854)

Synonyms
- Stilifer barronii A. Adams, 1855 superseded combination; Stylifer barronii A. Adams, 1855 (misspelling of genus)

Species of gastropod

Monogamus barronii is a species of sea snail, a marine gastropod mollusk in the family Eulimidae. The species is one of a number within the genus Eulimidae.

== Taxonomy ==
The generic allocation of this species is tentative (Warén 1980: 293).

== Description ==
(Original description in Latin) The shell is oval and turreted. it is white, shiny, and semitransparent, with an apex that is mucronate. It has seven whorls, which are flat, angulated posteriorly, and longitudinally obliquely striated. The aperture is oblong-oval, with the outer lip angulated posteriorly and the margin slightly thickened.
