= Echineulima philippinarum =

Scientific classification
- Kingdom: Animalia
- Phylum: Mollusca
- Class: Gastropoda
- Subclass: Caenogastropoda
- Order: Littorinimorpha
- Family: Eulimidae
- Genus: Echineulima
- Species: E. philippinarum

Binomial name
- Echineulima philippinarum G.B. Sowerby III, 1900

Synonyms
- Mucronalia philippinarum G.B. Sowerby III, 1900

Species of gastropod

Echineulima philippinarum (Sowerby, 1900)

Echineulima philippinarum is a species of sea snail, a marine gastropod mollusk in the family Eulimidae.
