= Stilifer birtsi =

- Shell of Stilifer birtsi (syntype at the Swedish Museum of Natural History)

Scientific classification
- Kingdom: Animalia
- Phylum: Mollusca
- Class: Gastropoda
- Subclass: Caenogastropoda
- Order: Littorinimorpha
- Family: Eulimidae
- Genus: Stilifer
- Species: S. birtsi

Binomial name
- Stilifer birtsi (Preston, 1904)

Synonyms
- Mucronalia birtsi Preston, 1904

Species of gastropod

Stilifer birtsi is a species of sea snail, a marine gastropod mollusk in the family Eulimidae. The species is one of a number within the genus Stilifer.

== Description ==
(Original description) The fusiform shell is rather attenuated, smooth, polished, and semi-transparent white. It has nine convex whorls; the apex is strongly mucronate, and the suture is slightly channelled. The aperture is inversely auriform, the columella is twisted, and the peristome is simple.

== Distribution ==
This marine species occurs off Sri Lanka.
