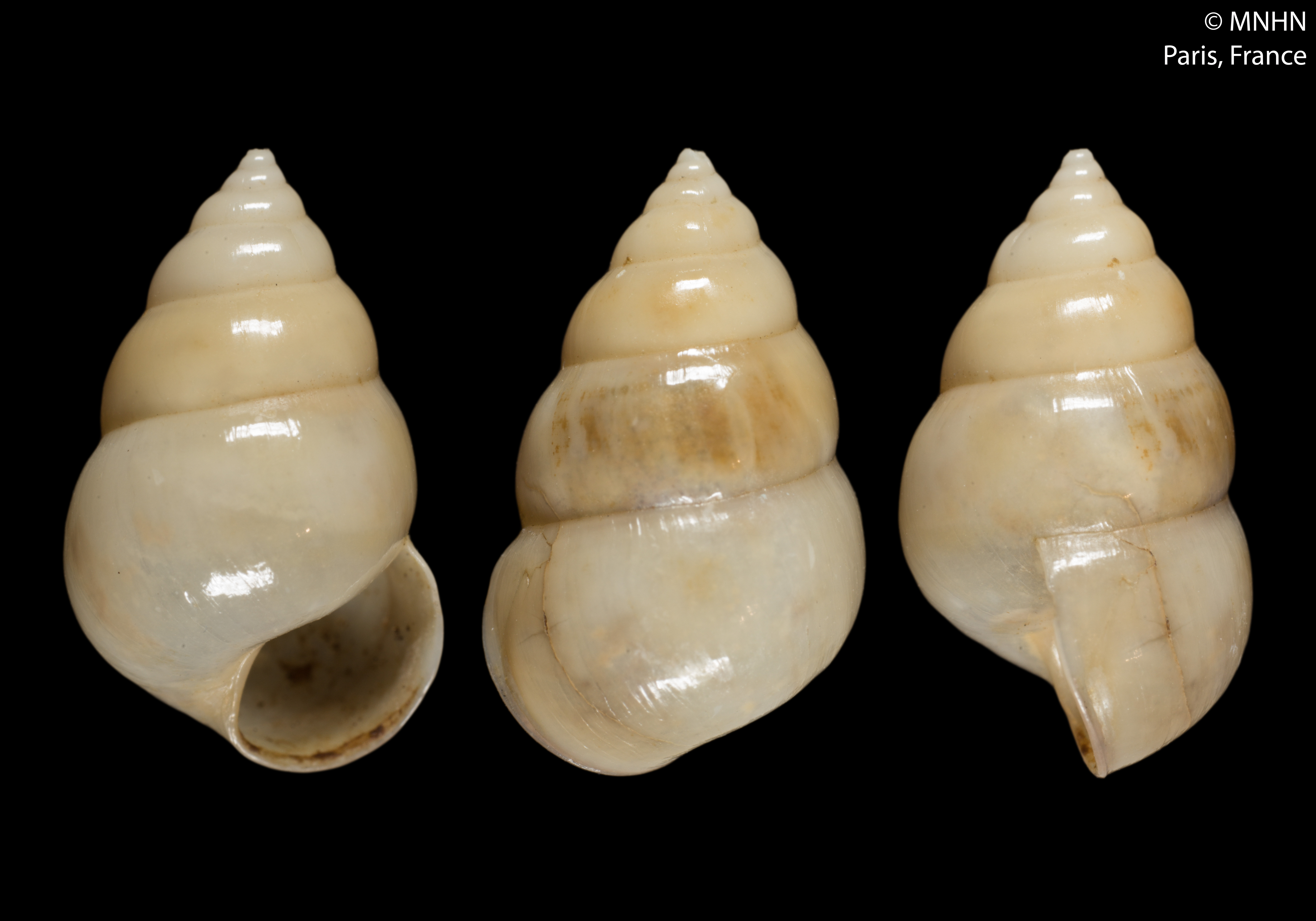
- Shell of Echineulima mittrei (syntype at MNHN, Paris)

Scientific classification
- Kingdom: Animalia
- Phylum: Mollusca
- Class: Gastropoda
- Subclass: Caenogastropoda
- Order: Littorinimorpha
- Family: Eulimidae
- Genus: Echineulima
- Species: E. mittrei

Binomial name
- Echineulima mittrei Petit de la Saussaye, 1851

Synonyms
- Echineulima apiculatus Souverbie, 1862; Echineulima dubius Baird, 1873; Echineulima eburneus Deshayes, 1863; Echineulima tokiokai Habe, 1952; Stilifer mittrei Habe, 1952; Stylifer apiculatus Souverbie, 1862; Stylifer dubius Baird, 1873; Stylifer eburneus Deshayes, 1863

= Echineulima mittrei =

Species of gastropod

Echineulima mittrei is a species of sea snail, a marine gastropod mollusk in the family Eulimidae.

== Distribution ==
This marine species occurs in the following locations:

- European waters (ERMS scope)
