= Goodingia capillastericola =

Scientific classification
- Kingdom: Animalia
- Phylum: Mollusca
- Class: Gastropoda
- Subclass: Caenogastropoda
- Order: Littorinimorpha
- Family: Eulimidae
- Genus: Goodingia
- Species: G. capillastericola

Binomial name
- Goodingia capillastericola Minichev, 1970

Synonyms
- Mucronalia capillastericola Minichev, 1970; Mucronella capillastericola [sic]

Crinoid-parasitic species of gastropod

Goodingia capillastericola is a species of sea snail, a marine gastropod mollusk in the family Eulimidae. This species, along with Goodingia varicosa belongs in the genus Goodingia and are crinoid-parasitic.

== Description ==
G. capillastericola has an oblong, transparent, conical shell ending in a body whorl. It has a small operculum with a large proboscis. They have hermaphroditic reproductive systems. Due to their transparent shells, their soft flesh is visually exposed, demonstrating their characteristic white-and-brown striped patterning.

As veliger, they possess a well-developed head and a foot, and small velar lobes (fleshy modules extending from the velum).

G. capillastericola differs from its congener, Goodingia varicosa, by having a rounder shell and a different position of its seminal vesicle in its hermaphroditic reproductive system, hence their inability to cross-reproduce.

== Habitat ==
Goodingia capillastericola has been found in the Northern Red Sea (Gulf of Aqaba), Japan (Amami-Oshima Island), and Papa New Guinea (Sek Island, Madang Province). Specimens have been found attached to arms of the feather star Capillaster multiradiatus in coral reefs 2-2.5m deep. Specimens found in Japan and Papa New Guinea were found to be morphologically identical, but genetically distinct.
