= Stilifer guentheri =

- Shell of Stilifer guentheri (specimen at Naturalis Biodiversity Center)

Scientific classification
- Kingdom: Animalia
- Phylum: Mollusca
- Class: Gastropoda
- Subclass: Caenogastropoda
- Order: Littorinimorpha
- Family: Eulimidae
- Genus: Stilifer
- Species: S. guentheri

Binomial name
- Stilifer guentheri (Angas, 1877)

Synonyms
- Apicalia guentheri Angas, 1877 (original combination)

Species of gastropod

Stilifer guentheri is a species of sea snail, a marine gastropod mollusk in the family Eulimidae. The species is one of a number within the genus Stilifer.

== Description ==
(Original description) The thin shell is globose-subulate, subpellucid, shining, horn-coloured, very finely longitudinally striated, and, under the lens, minutely transversely striate on the upper whorls; The shell contains seven whorls . These are very slightly convex and flattened immediately below the sutures; the large body whorl is inflated, and hardly subangulate at the periphery; apical whorls of the spire absent; the sutures are impressed; the aperture is semilunar, pointed behind and rounded in front; the columellar margin is arcuate and thickened towards the base; the outer lip is thin, simple, rounded, and slightly flattened above.

== Distribution ==
This marine species occurs in the Indian Ocean off Mauritius; also off Australia (New South Wales)
