= Echineulima biformis =

Scientific classification
- Kingdom: Animalia
- Phylum: Mollusca
- Class: Gastropoda
- Subclass: Caenogastropoda
- Order: Littorinimorpha
- Family: Eulimidae
- Genus: Echineulima
- Species: E. biformis

Binomial name
- Echineulima biformis G. B. Sowerby III, 1897

Synonyms
- Apicalia biformis G. B. Sowerby III, 1897

Species of gastropod

Echineulima biformis is a species of sea snail, a marine gastropod mollusk in the family Eulimidae.

== Distribution ==
- Marine
