= Stilifer quadrasi =

Scientific classification
- Kingdom: Animalia
- Phylum: Mollusca
- Class: Gastropoda
- Subclass: Caenogastropoda
- Order: Littorinimorpha
- Family: Eulimidae
- Genus: Stilifer
- Species: S. quadrasi

Binomial name
- Stilifer quadrasi (O. Boettger, 1893)

Synonyms
- Eulima quadrasi O. Boettger, 1893

Species of gastropod

Stilifer quadrasi is a species of sea snail, a marine gastropod mollusk in the family Eulimidae. It is one of many species in Stilifer genus.

== Description ==
(Original description in Latin) The shell is elongately turreted and slightly curved to the right. it is very solid, white, shining, and polished. The spire is convex on the left side and somewhat constricted on the right; the varices are broad, deeply impressed, and continuous. The apex is shortly decollated and opaque white.

The 10½ surviving whorls are somewhat flattened to slightly convex, separated by a distinct and rather deep suture, and increase slowly in size. The body whorl is rounded to subangulate at the periphery and somewhat convex at the base; it equals two sevenths of the height of the shell.

The aperture is moderate in size, slightly narrowed, semioval, and rounded at the base. The peristome is thickened and blunt, with its margins joined by a callus; the right margin is slightly curved in the middle, the basal margin is somewhat receding, and the columellar margin is concave and appressed.

== Distribution ==
This marine species occurs off Indonesia and the Philippines.
