= Chaetonotus atrox =

Scientific classification
- Kingdom: Animalia
- Phylum: Gastrotricha
- Order: Chaetonotida
- Family: Chaetonotidae
- Genus: Chaetonotus
- Species: C. atrox

Binomial name
- Chaetonotus atrox Wilke, 1954

Species of gastrotrich

Chaetonotus atrox is a species of gastrotrichs belonging to the family Chaetonotidae.

The species is native to Northern Europe. The species lives in marine environments.
