= Chaetonotus elegans =

Scientific classification
- Domain: Eukaryota
- Kingdom: Animalia
- Phylum: Gastrotricha
- Order: Chaetonotida
- Family: Chaetonotidae
- Genus: Chaetonotus
- Subgenus: Chaetonotus
- Species: C. elegans

Binomial name
- Chaetonotus elegans Konsuloff, 1921

Synonyms
- Chaetonotus (Chaetonotus) elegans Konsuloff, 1921

Species of microscopic worm

Chaetonotus elegans is a species of gastrotrichs in the genus Chaetonotus. It is found in freshwater of Europe.
