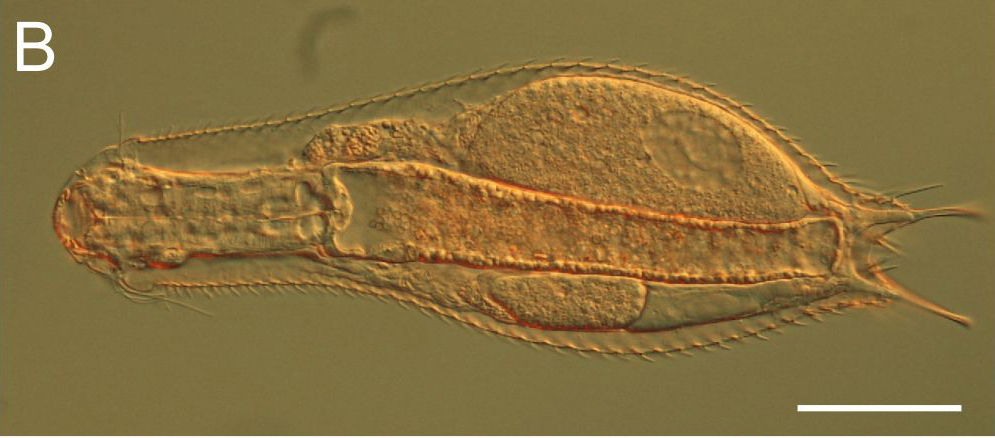
- Chaetonotus (Chaetonotus) polyspinosus

Scientific classification
- Kingdom: Animalia
- Phylum: Gastrotricha
- Order: Chaetonotida
- Family: Chaetonotidae
- Genus: Chaetonotus
- Subgenus: Chaetonotus; Erhenberg, 1838

Type species
- Chaetonotus larus (Müller, 1773)

Species
- Chaetonotus aculeatus - Chaetonotus aegilonensis - Chaetonotus alatus - Chaetonotus alni - Chaetonotus angustus - Chaetonotus apechochaetus - Chaetonotus australiensis - Chaetonotus beauchampi - Chaetonotus benacensis - Chaetonotus bifidispinosus - Chaetonotus brasiliensis - Chaetonotus breviacanthus - Chaetonotus brevis - Chaetonotus brevisetosus - Chaetonotus brevispinosus - Chaetonotus condensus - Chaetonotus dadayi - Chaetonotus daphnes - Chaetonotus disjunctus - Chaetonotus dybowskii - Chaetonotus elegans - Chaetonotus fluviatilis - Chaetonotus formosus - Chaetonotus furcatus - Chaetonotus gelidus - Chaetonotus heterospinosus - Chaetonotus hirsutus - Chaetonotus hoanicus - Chaetonotus ichthydioides - Chaetonotus illiesi - Chaetonotus intermedius - Chaetonotus jaceki - Chaetonotus laroides - Chaetonotus larus - Chaetonotus linguaeformis - Chaetonotus lobo - Chaetonotus longisetosus - Chaetonotus lunatospinosus - Chaetonotus magnificus - Chaetonotus maximus - Chaetonotus mediterraneus - Chaetonotus microchaetus - Chaetonotus minimus - Chaetonotus mitraformis - Chaetonotus montevideensis - Chaetonotus multispinosus - Chaetonotus naiadis - Chaetonotus napoleonicus - Chaetonotus oculatus - Chaetonotus oculifer - Chaetonotus odontopharynx - Chaetonotus oplites - Chaetonotus paluster - Chaetonotus parafurcatus - Chaetonotus paucisquamatus - Chaetonotus pawlowskii - Chaetonotus pilaga - Chaetonotus polonicus - Chaetonotus polyspinosus - Chaetonotus poznaniensis - Chaetonotus pratensis - Chaetonotus pseudopolyspinosus - Chaetonotus puniceus - Chaetonotus rarispinosus - Chaetonotus remanei - Chaetonotus sanctipauli - Chaetonotus schoepferae - Chaetonotus scutatus - Chaetonotus siciliensis - Chaetonotus silvaticus - Chaetonotus similis - Chaetonotus sphagnophilus - Chaetonotus splendidus - Chaetonotus stagnalis - Chaetonotus svalbardi - Chaetonotus tempestivus - Chaetonotus triacanthus - Chaetonotus vellosus - Chaetonotus ventrochaetus - Chaetonotus venustus - Chaetonotus vulgaris

= Chaetonotus (Chaetonotus) =

Subgenus of microscopic worms

Chaetonotus (Chaetonotus) is a gastrotrich subgenus in the family Chaetonotidae. The type species is Chaetonotus larus.
