= Crasiella clauseni =

Scientific classification
- Kingdom: Animalia
- Phylum: Gastrotricha
- Order: Macrodasyida
- Family: Planodasyidae
- Genus: Crasiella
- Species: C. clauseni

Binomial name
- Crasiella clauseni Lee & Chang, 2012

Species of Gastrotrich

Crasiella clauseni is a species of gastrotrich in the family Planodasyidae.

== Taxonomy and etymology ==
Crasiella clauseni was first scientifically described in 2012. Type specimens were collected around Saeseom islet, 150 meters from Jeju Island, South Korea. The specific name clauseni honors Claus Clausen, who first erected the genus Crasiella.

== Description ==
Crasiella clauseni has a length of 366–440 μm (with an average of 396 μm) and a maximum width of 41–58 μm. Its smooth upper surface lacks any hooks, scales, or plates. The lower halves of the sides bear 120 adhesive tubes each. The anterior tubes are arranged in 5–7 horizontal rows of 2–6 tubes each. The pharyngeal region bears a pair of ventral adhesive tubes.
