= Dichaeturidae =

Scientific classification
- Kingdom: Animalia
- Phylum: Gastrotricha
- Order: Chaetonotida
- Suborder: Paucitubulatina
- Family: Dichaeturidae; Remane, 1927

Family of gastrotrichs

Dichaeturidae is a family of gastrotrichs belonging to the order Chaetonotida.

Genera:

- Dichaetura Lauterborn, 1913
- Marinellina Ruttner-Kolisko, 1955
