= Crasiella =

Scientific classification
- Kingdom: Animalia
- Phylum: Gastrotricha
- Order: Macrodasyida
- Family: Planodasyidae
- Genus: Crasiella; Clausen, 1968

Genus of gastrotrichs

Crasiella is a genus of gastrotrichs in the family Planodasyidae. It contains nine species.

== Species ==
Crasiella contains the following species:

- Crasiella azorrensis Hummon, 2008
- Crasiella clauseni Lee & Chang, 2012
- Crasiella diplura Clausen, 1968
- Crasiella fonseci Hochberg, 2014
- Crasiella indica Rao, 1981
- Crasiella kocoti Araujo & Hochberg, 2023
- Crasiella oceanica d'Hondt, 1974
- Crasiella pacifica Schmidt, 1974
- Crasiella skaia Hummon, 2010
