= Turbanella =

Scientific classification
- Kingdom: Animalia
- Phylum: Gastrotricha
- Order: Macrodasyida
- Family: Turbanellidae
- Genus: Turbanella; Schultze, 1853

Genus of gastrotrichs

Turbanella is a genus of gastrotrichs belonging to the family Turbanellidae.

The genus has almost cosmopolitan distribution.

== Species ==
Species:

- Turbanella ambronensis Remane, 1943
- Turbanella aminensis Rao, 1991
- Turbanella amphiatlantica Hummon & Kelly, 2011
- Turbanella bengalensis Rao & Ganapati, 1968
- Turbanella bocqueti Kaplan, 1958 sensu Boaden, 1974
- Turbanella brusci Hochberg, 2002
- Turbanella caledoniensis Hummon, 2008
- Turbanella corderoi Dioni, 1960
- Turbanella cornuta Remane, 1925
- Turbanella cuspidata Yamauchi & Kajihara, 2018
- Turbanella erythrothalassia Hummon, 2011
- Turbanella hyalina Schultze, 1853
- Turbanella indica Rao, 1981
- Turbanella lobata Yamauchi & Kajihara, 2018
- Turbanella lutheri Remane, 1952
- Turbanella mikrogada Hummon, 2008
- Turbanella multidigitata Kisielewski, 1987
- Turbanella mustela Wieser, 1957
- Turbanella ocellata Hummon, 1974
- Turbanella otti Schrom in Riedl, 1970
- Turbanella pacifica Schmidt, 1974
- Turbanella palaciosi Remane, 1953
- Turbanella petiti Remane, 1952
- Turbanella pilosum Kolicka, Kotwicki & Dabert, 2018
- Turbanella pontica Valkanov, 1957
- Turbanella reducta Boaden, 1974
- Turbanella remanei Forneris, 1961
- Turbanella scilloniensis Hummon, 2008
- Turbanella subterranea Remane, 1934
- Turbanella varians Maguire, 1976
- Turbanella veneziana Schrom, 1972
- Turbanella wieseri Hummon, 2010
