= Dichaetura =

Scientific classification
- Kingdom: Animalia
- Phylum: Gastrotricha
- Order: Chaetonotida
- Family: Dichaeturidae
- Genus: Dichaetura; Lauterborn, 1913

Genus of microscopic animals

Dichaetura is a genus of gastrotrichs belonging to the family Dichaeturidae.

The species of this genus are found in Europe. Dichaetura filispina has been found only in rice paddies in Shiga, Japan.

Species:

- Dichaetura capricornia (Metschnikoff, 1865)
- Dichaetura filispina Suzuki, Maeda & Furuya, 2013
- Dichaetura piscator (Murray, 1913)
- Dichaetura surreyi Martin, 1990
