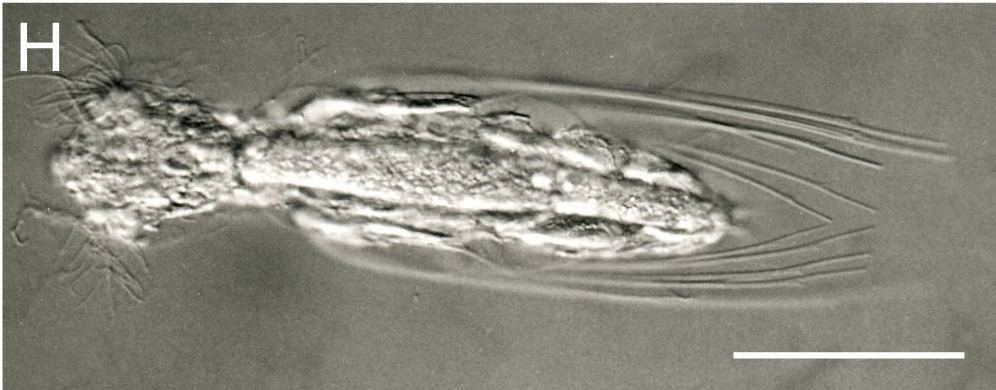
- Stylochaeta fusiformis

Scientific classification
- Kingdom: Animalia
- Phylum: Gastrotricha
- Order: Chaetonotida
- Family: Dasydytidae
- Genus: Stylochaeta; Hlava, 1904

= Stylochaeta =

Genus of microscopic animals

Stylochaeta is a genus of gastrotrichs belonging to the family Dasydytidae.

The species of this genus are found in Europe.

Species:

- Stylochaeta fusiformis (Spencer, 1890)
- Stylochaeta longispinosa Greuter, 1917
- Stylochaeta scirtetica Brunson, 1950
- Stylochaeta stylifera (Voigt, 1901)
