= Acanthodasys =

Scientific classification
- Kingdom: Animalia
- Phylum: Gastrotricha
- Order: Macrodasyida
- Family: Thaumastodermatidae
- Genus: Acanthodasys; Remane, 1927

Genus of gastrotrichs

Acanthodasys is a genus of gastrotrichs belonging to the family Thaumastodermatidae.

The species of this genus are found in Europe and the Americas.

Species:

- Acanthodasys aculeatus Remane, 1927
- Acanthodasys algarvense Hummon, 2008
- Acanthodasys arcassonensis Kisielewski, 1987
- Acanthodasys australis Bosco, Lourenço, Guidi, Balsamo, Hochberg & Garraffoni, 2020
- Acanthodasys caribbeanensis Hochberg & Atherton, 2010
- Acanthodasys carolinensis Hummon, 2008
- Acanthodasys comtus Lee, 2012
- Acanthodasys ericinus Lee, 2012
- Acanthodasys fibrosus Clausen, 2004
- Acanthodasys flabellicaudus Hummon & Todaro, 2009
- Acanthodasys lineatus Clausen, 2000
- Acanthodasys paurocactus Atherton & Hochberg, 2012
- Acanthodasys silvulus Evans, 1992
