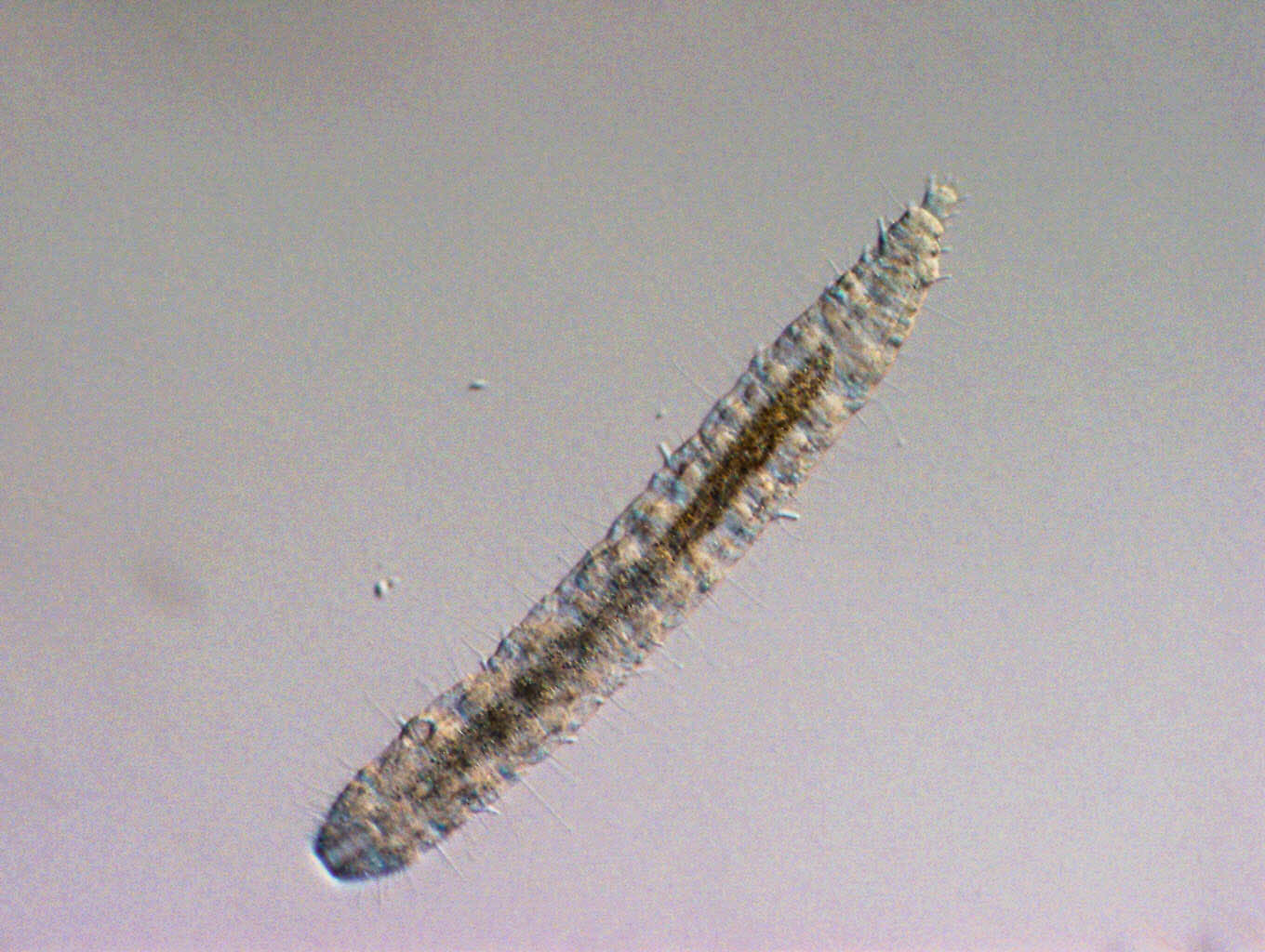

Scientific classification
- Kingdom: Animalia
- Phylum: Gastrotricha
- Order: Macrodasyida
- Family: Macrodasyidae
- Genus: Macrodasys; Remane, 1924

= Macrodasys =

Genus of gastrotrichs

Macrodasys is a genus of gastrotrichs belonging to the family Macrodasyidae.

The species of this genus are found in Europe, Central America, India.

Species:

- Macrodasys achradocytalis Evans, 1994
- Macrodasys acrosorus Hummon & Todaro, 2009
- Macrodasys affinis Remane, 1936
- Macrodasys africanus Remane, 1950
- Macrodasys ancocytalis Evans, 1994
- Macrodasys andamanensis Rao, 1993
- Macrodasys balticus Roszczak, 1939
- Macrodasys blysocytalis Evans, 1994
- Macrodasys buddenbrocki Remane, 1924
- Macrodasys caudatus Remane, 1927
- Macrodasys cephalatus Remane, 1927
- Macrodasys cunctatus Wieser, 1957
- Macrodasys deltocytalis Evans, 1994
- Macrodasys digronus Hummon & Todaro, 2009
- Macrodasys dolichocytalis Evans, 1994
- Macrodasys fornerisae Todaro & Rocha, 2004
- Macrodasys gerlachi Papi, 1957
- Macrodasys gylius Hummon, 2010
- Macrodasys imbricatus Hummon, 2011
- Macrodasys lakshadweepense Hummon, 2008
- Macrodasys macrurus Hummon, 2011
- Macrodasys meristocytalis Evans, 1994
- Macrodasys neapolitanus Papi, 1957
- Macrodasys nigrocellus Hummon, 2011
- Macrodasys ommatus Todaro & Leasi, 2013
- Macrodasys pacificus Schmidt, 1974
- Macrodasys plurosorus Hummon, 2008
- Macrodasys scleracrus Hummon, 2011
- Macrodasys stenocytalis Evans, 1994
- Macrodasys syringodes Hummon, 2010
- Macrodasys thuscus Luporini, Magagnini & Tongiorgi, 1973
- Macrodasys waltairensis Rao & Ganapati, 1968
