= Dasydytes =

Scientific classification
- Kingdom: Animalia
- Phylum: Gastrotricha
- Order: Chaetonotida
- Family: Dasydytidae
- Genus: Dasydytes; Gosse, 1851

Genus of microscopic animals

Dasydytes is a genus of gastrotrichs belonging to the family Dasydytidae.

The species of this genus are Southern America.

Species:

- Dasydytes asymmetricus Schwank, 1990
- Dasydytes carvalhoae Kisielewski, 1991
- Dasydytes elongatus Kisielewski, 1991
- Dasydytes goniathrix Gosse, 1851
- Dasydytes lamellatus Kisielewski, 1991
- Dasydytes monile Horlick, 1975
- Dasydytes nhumirimensis Kisielewski, 1991
- Dasydytes ornatus Voigt, 1909
- Dasydytes papaveroi Kisielewski, 1991
- Dasydytes zelinkai Lauterborn, 1901
