= Setopus =

Scientific classification
- Kingdom: Animalia
- Phylum: Gastrotricha
- Order: Chaetonotida
- Family: Dasydytidae
- Genus: Setopus; Grünspan, 1908

Genus of microscopic animals

Setopus is a genus of gastrotrichs belonging to the family Dasydytidae.

Species:

- Setopus abarbita (Visvesvara, 1964)
- Setopus aequatorialis Kisielewski, 1991
- Setopus bisetosus (Thompson, 1891)
- Setopus chatticus (Schwank, 1990)
- Setopus dubius (Voigt, 1909)
- Setopus iunctus Greuter, 1917
- Setopus lemnicola Schwank, 1990
- Setopus pentasetosus Saponi, Cesaretti, Kosakyan, Serra & Todaro, 2026
- Setopus primus Grünspan, 1908
- Setopus tongiorgii (Balsamo, 1983)
