= Halichaetonotus =

Scientific classification
- Kingdom: Animalia
- Phylum: Gastrotricha
- Order: Chaetonotida
- Family: Chaetonotidae
- Genus: Halichaetonotus; Remane, 1936

Genus of gastrotrichs

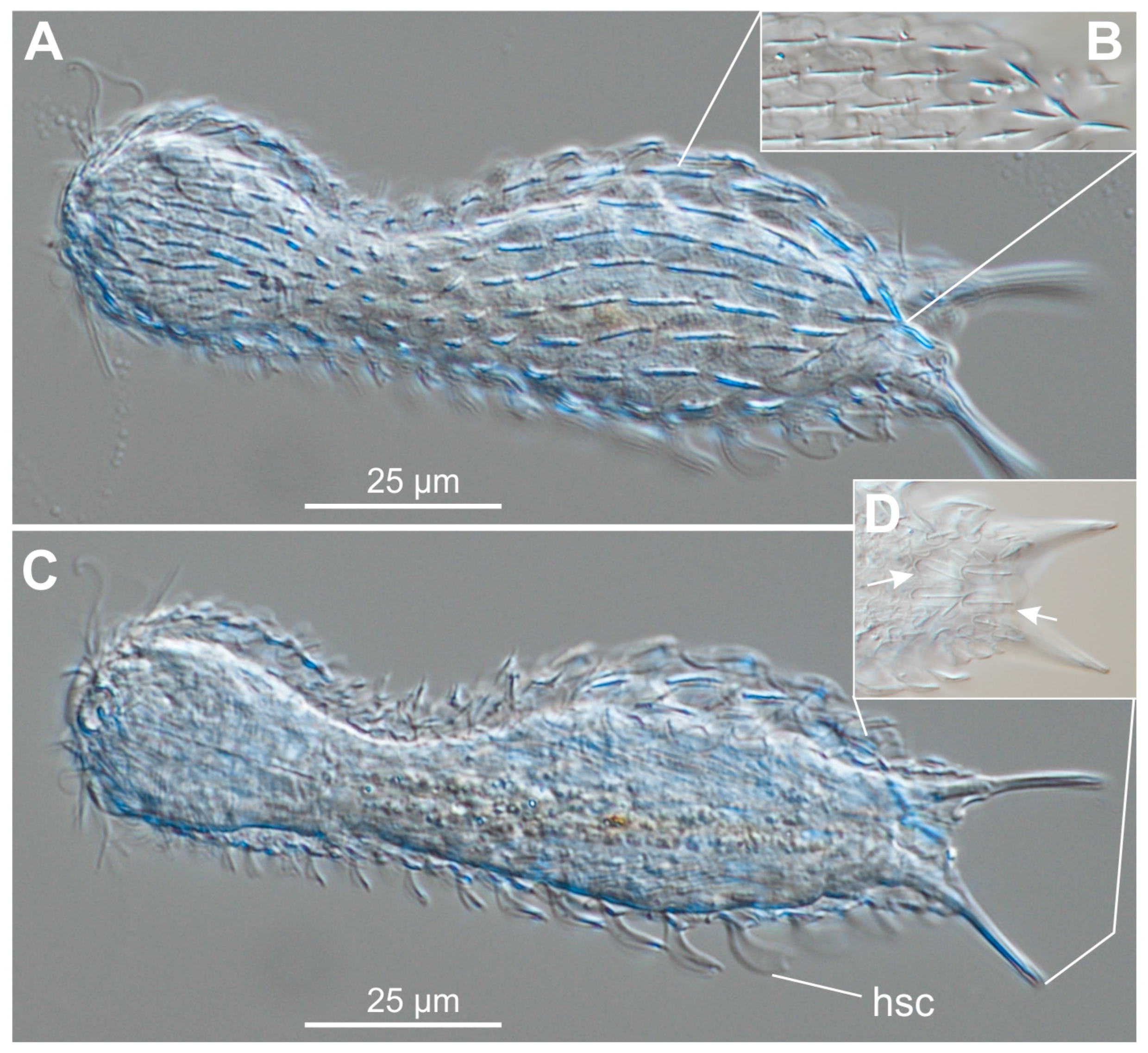
Photomicrographs of Halichaetonotus euromarinus found at Cap Angela

Halichaetonotus is a genus of gastrotrichs belonging to the family Chaetonotidae.

The species of this genus are found in Europe and Central America.

== Species ==
Species:

- Halichaetonotus aculifer (Gerlach, 1953)
- Halichaetonotus arenarius (d'Hondt, 1971)
- Halichaetonotus atlanticus Kisielewski, 1988
- Halichaetonotus australis Warwick & Todaro, 2005
- Halichaetonotus balticus Kisielewski, 1975
- Halichaetonotus bataceus Evans, 1992
- Halichaetonotus batillifer (Luporini & Tongiorgi, 1972)
- Halichaetonotus bizertae Souid, Gammoudi, Saponi, El Cafsi & Todaro, 2025
- Halichaetonotus clavicornis Balsamo, Fregni & Tongiorgi, 1995
- Halichaetonotus decipiens (Remane, 1929)
- Halichaetonotus etrolomus Hummon, Balsamo & Todaro, 1992
- Halichaetonotus euromarinus Hummon & Todaro, 2010
- Halichaetonotus genatus Balsamo, Fregni & Tongiorgi, 1995
- Halichaetonotus italicus Balsamo, Hummon, Todaro & Tongiorgi, 1997
- Halichaetonotus jucundus (d'Hondt, 1971)
- Halichaetonotus lamellatus Kisielewski, 1975
- Halichaetonotus littoralis (d'Hondt, 1971)
- Halichaetonotus margaretae Hummon, Balsamo & Todaro, 1992
- Halichaetonotus marivagus Balsamo, Todaro & Tongiorgi, 1992
- Halichaetonotus paradoxus (Remane, 1927)
- Halichaetonotus parvus (Wilke, 1954)
- Halichaetonotus pleuracanthus (Remane, 1926)
- Halichaetonotus polonense Hummon, 2008
- Halichaetonotus riedli Schrom, 1972
- Halichaetonotus sanctaeluciae Todaro, Dal Zotto, Bownes & Perissinotto, 2011
- Halichaetonotus schromi Kisielewski, 1975
- Halichaetonotus somniculosus (Mock, 1979)
- Halichaetonotus susi Hummon, 2010
- Halichaetonotus swedmarki Schrom, 1972
- Halichaetonotus tentaculatus (d'Hondt, 1971)
- Halichaetonotus testiculophorus (Hummon, 1966)
- Halichaetonotus thalassopais Hummon, Balsamo & Todaro, 1992
