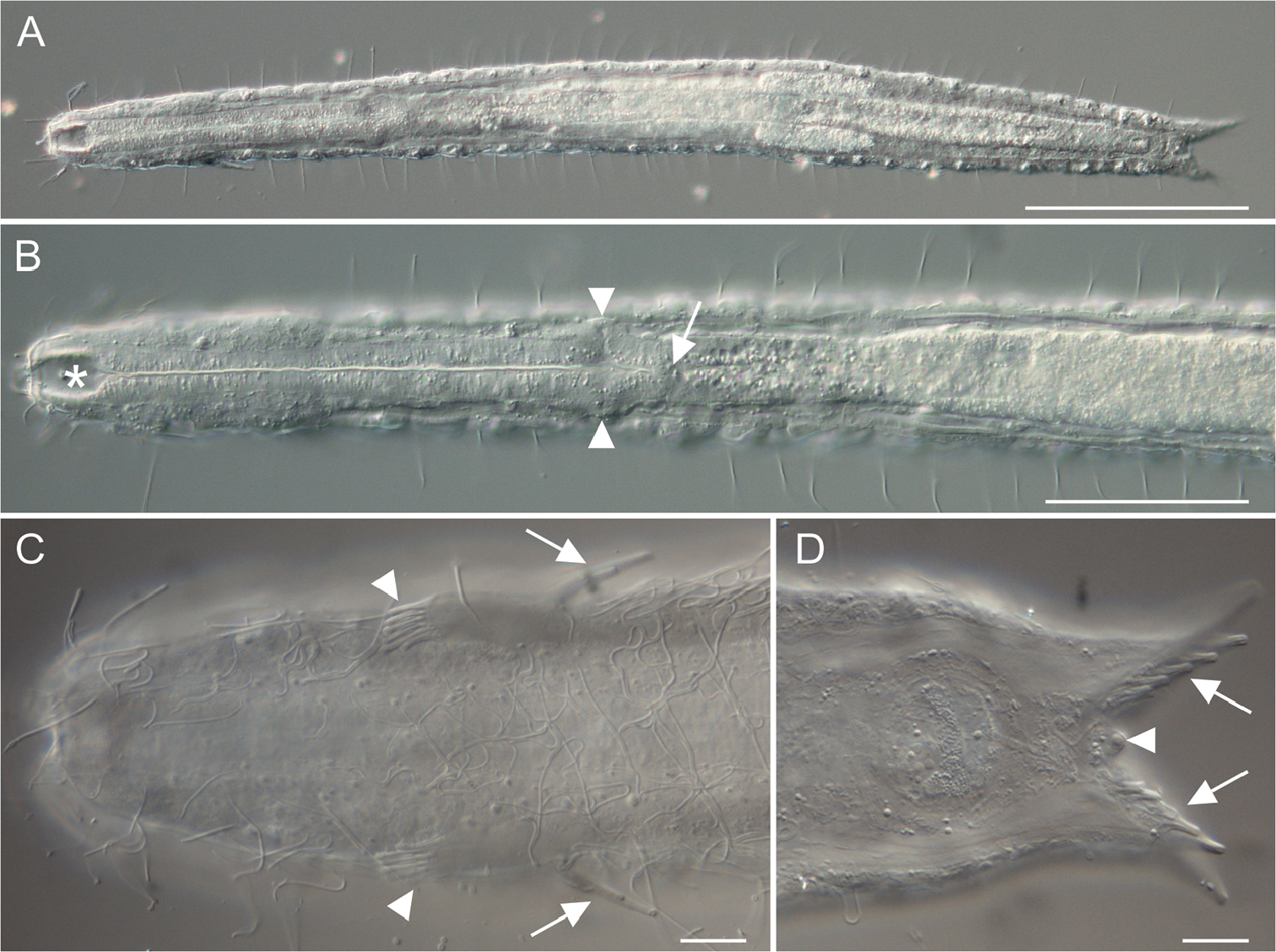
- Paraturbanella xaymacana is a species in this genus. Differential interference contrast photo micrograph showing ventral view of different regions. Scale bars: 100 μm (A), 50 μm (B), 20 μm (C–D).

Scientific classification
- Kingdom: Animalia
- Phylum: Gastrotricha
- Order: Macrodasyida
- Family: Turbanellidae
- Genus: Paraturbanella; Remane, 1927

= Paraturbanella =

Genus of gastrotrichs

Paraturbanella is a genus of gastrotrichs belonging to the family Turbanellidae.

The genus has almost cosmopolitan distribution.

Species:

- Paraturbanella africana Todaro, Dal Zotto, Bownes & Perissinotto, 2017
- Paraturbanella aggregotubulata Evans, 1992
- Paraturbanella armoricana (Swedmark, 1954)
- Paraturbanella boadeni Rao & Ganapati, 1968
- Paraturbanella brevicaudata Rao, 1991
- Paraturbanella cuanensis Maguire, 1976
- Paraturbanella dohrni Remane, 1927
- Paraturbanella dolichodema Hummon, 2010
- Paraturbanella eireanna Maguire, 1976
- Paraturbanella intermedia Wieser, 1957
- Paraturbanella levantia Hummon, 2011
- Paraturbanella manxensis Hummon, 2008
- Paraturbanella mesoptera Rao, 1970
- Paraturbanella pacifica Schmidt, 1974
- Paraturbanella pallida Luporini, Magagnini & Tongiorgi, 1973
- Paraturbanella palpibara Rao & Ganapati, 1968
- Paraturbanella pediballetor Hummon, 2008
- Paraturbanella sanjuanensis Hummon, 2010
- Paraturbanella scanica Clausen, 1996
- Paraturbanella solitaria Todaro, 1995
- Paraturbanella stradbroki Hochberg, 2002
- Paraturbanella teissieri Swedmark, 1954
- Paraturbanella tricaudata Campos, Todaro & Garraffoni, 2020
- Paraturbanella xaymacana Dal Zotto, Leasi & Todaro, 2018
