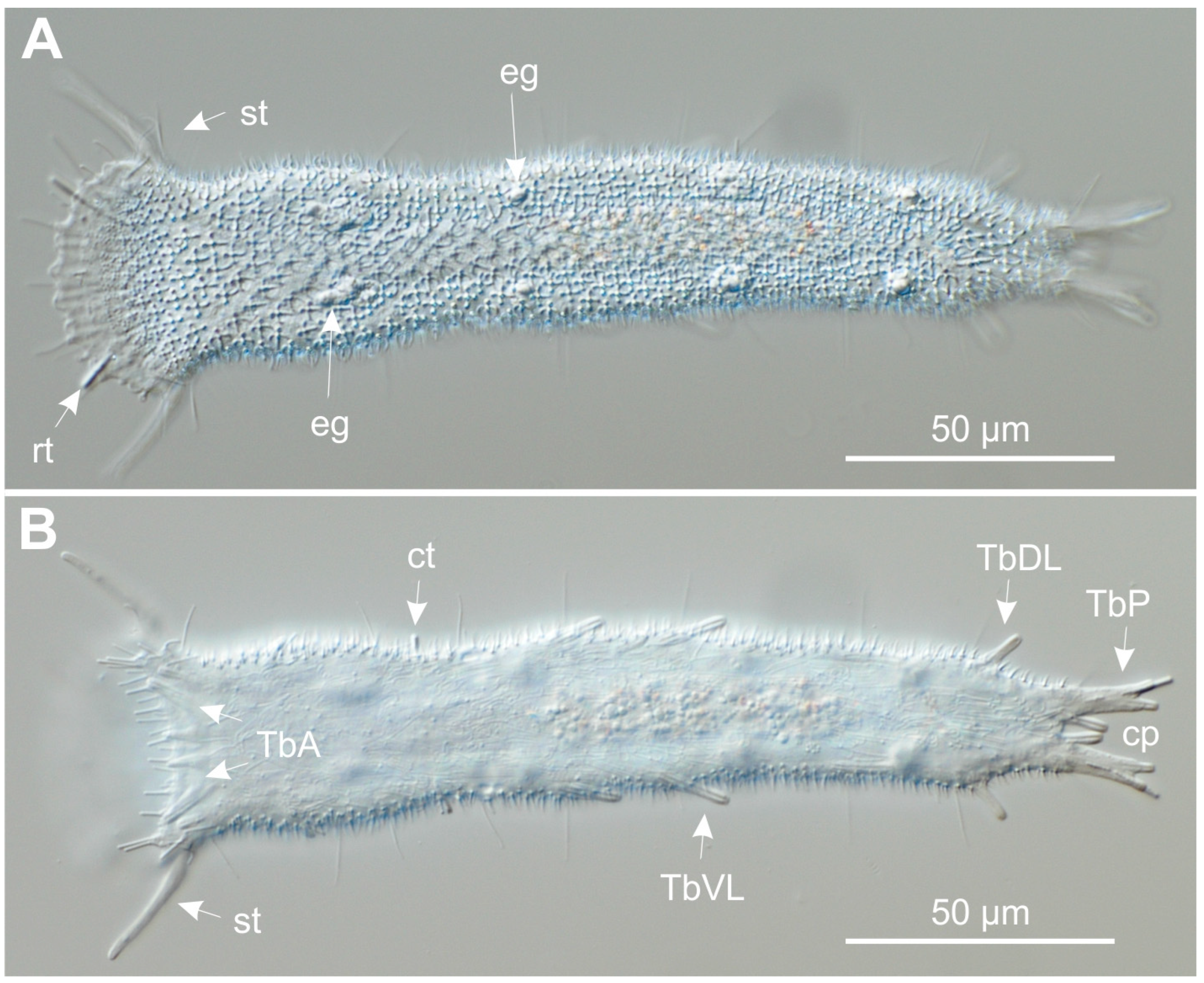
- Juvenile specimen of Tetranchyrodeema papii.

Scientific classification
- Kingdom: Animalia
- Phylum: Gastrotricha
- Order: Macrodasyida
- Family: Thaumastodermatidae
- Genus: Tetranchyroderma; Remane, 1926

= Tetranchyroderma =

Genus of gastrotrichs

Tetranchyroderma is a genus of gastrotrichs belonging to the family Thaumastodermatidae.

The genus has cosmopolitan distribution.

== Species ==
Species:

- Tetranchyroderma aapton Dal Zotto, Ghiviriga & Todaro, 2010
- Tetranchyroderma adeleae Hochberg, 2008
- Tetranchyroderma aethesbregmum Lee & Chang, 2012
