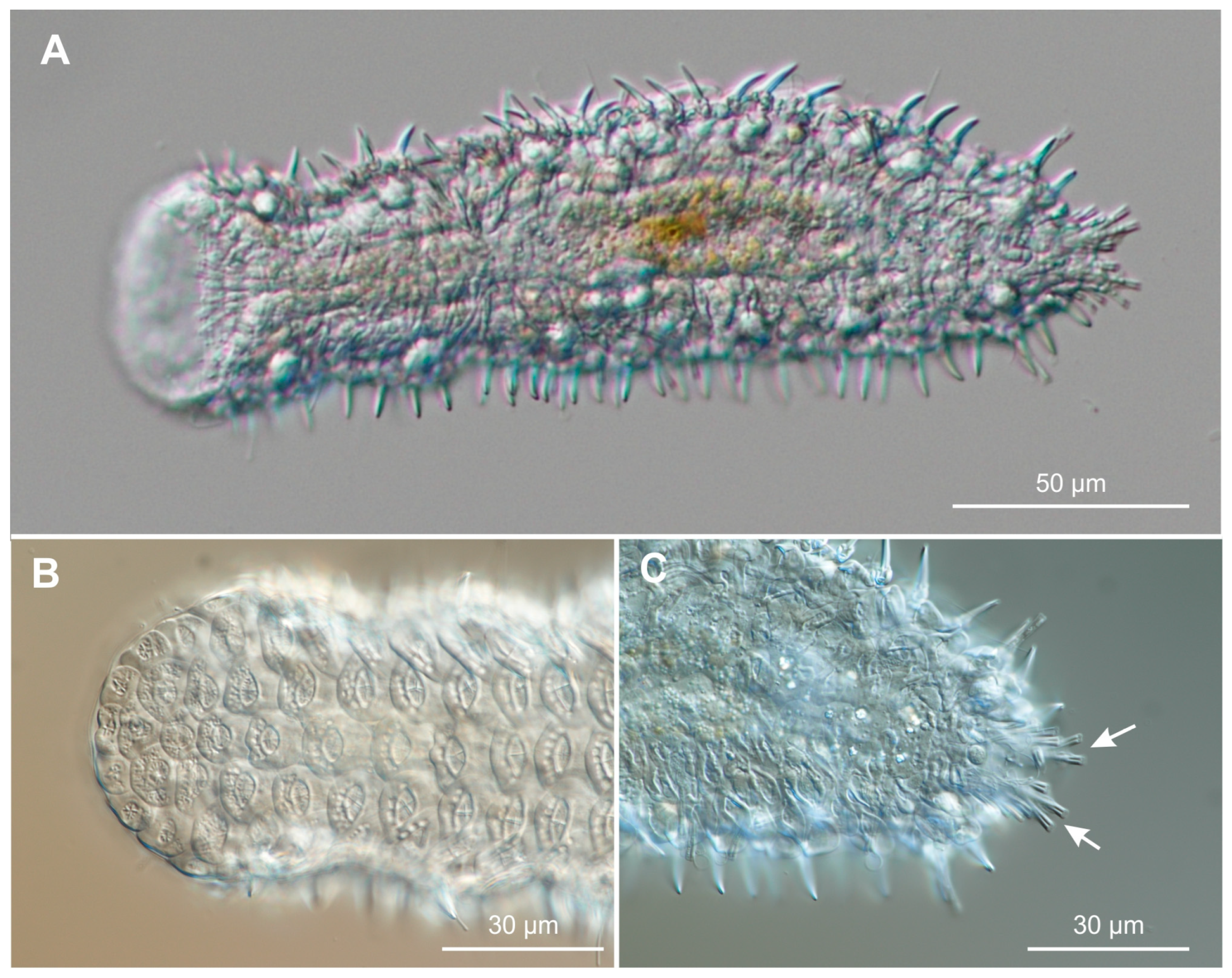
- Figure 8. Photomicrographs of Diplodasys sanctimariae found at Les Grottes: (A) habitus; (B) anterior end, dorsal view, showing the cuticular scales; (C) posterior end, ventral view, showing the posterior adhesive tubes (arrows). Differential interference contrast microscopy (Nomarski).

Scientific classification
- Kingdom: Animalia
- Phylum: Gastrotricha
- Order: Macrodasyida
- Family: Thaumastodermatidae
- Genus: Diplodasys; Remane, 1927

= Diplodasys =

Genus of worms

Diplodasys is a genus of gastrotrichs belonging to the family Thaumastodermatidae. The species of this genus are found in Europe.

Species:

- Diplodasys ankeli Wilke, 1954
- Diplodasys caudatus Kisielewski, 1987
- Diplodasys meloriae Todaro, Balsamo & Tongiorgi, 1992
- Diplodasys minor Remane, 1936
- Diplodasys pacificus Schmidt, 1974
- Diplodasys platydasyoides Remane, 1927
- Diplodasys remanei Rao & Ganapati, 1968
- Diplodasys rothei Kieneke, Narkus, Hochberg & Schmidt-Rhaesa, 2013
- Diplodasys sanctimariae Hummon & Todaro, 2009
- Diplodasys swedmarki Kisielewski, 1987
