= Fluxiderma =

Scientific classification
- Kingdom: Animalia
- Phylum: Gastrotricha
- Order: Chaetonotida
- Family: Chaetonotidae
- Genus: Fluxiderma d'Hondt, 1974

Genus of microscopic animals

Fluxiderma is a genus of gastrotrichs belonging to the family Chaetonotidae.

Species:

- Fluxiderma concinnum (Stokes, 1887)
- Fluxiderma montanum (Rudescu, 1967)
- Fluxiderma verrucosum (Roszczak, 1935)
