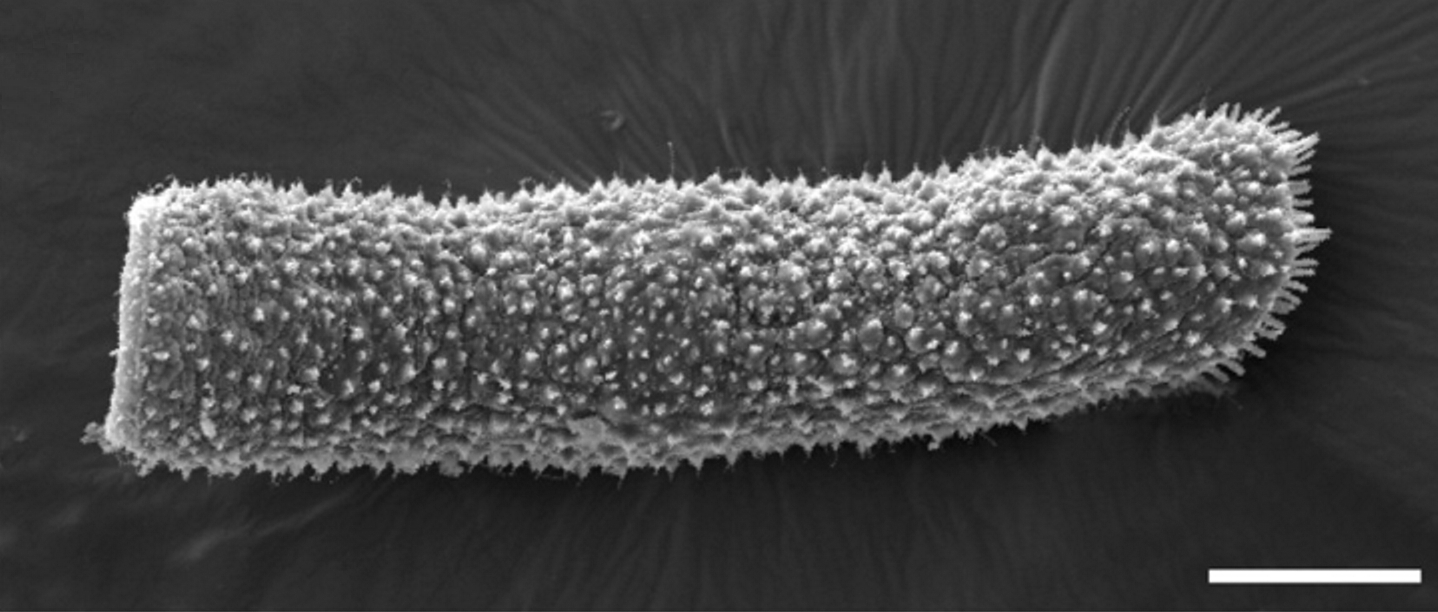

Scientific classification
- Kingdom: Animalia
- Phylum: Gastrotricha
- Order: Macrodasyida
- Family: Thaumastodermatidae
- Genus: Oregodasys; Hummon, 2008

= Oregodasys =

Genus of gastrotrichs

Oregodasys is a genus of gastrotrichs belonging to the family Thaumastodermatidae.

The species of this genus are found in Central America.

Species:

- Oregodasys ashleigha Araujo, Atherton & Hochberg, 2015
- Oregodasys caymanensis Hochberg, Atherton & Kieneke, 2014
- Oregodasys cirratus Rothe & Schmidt-Rhaesa, 2010
- Oregodasys itoi (Chang, Kubota & Shirayama, 2002)
- Oregodasys katharinae Hochberg, 2010
- Oregodasys kurnowensis Hummon, 2008
- Oregodasys mastigurus (Clausen, 1965)
- Oregodasys maximus (Remane, 1927)
- Oregodasys norenburgi Hochberg, 2010
- Oregodasys ocellatus (Clausen, 1965)
- Oregodasys pacificus (Schmidt, 1974)
- Oregodasys phacellatus (Clausen, 1965)
- Oregodasys rarus (Forneris, 1961)
- Oregodasys ruber (Swedmark, 1956)
- Oregodasys schultzi Remane, 1940
- Oregodasys styliferus (Boaden, 1965)
- Oregodasys tentaculatus (Swedmark, 1956)
