= Aspidiophorus =

Scientific classification
- Kingdom: Animalia
- Phylum: Gastrotricha
- Order: Chaetonotida
- Family: Chaetonotidae
- Genus: Aspidiophorus; Voigt, 1903

Genus of microscopic animals

Aspidiophorus is a genus of gastrotrichs belonging to the family Chaetonotidae.

The species of this genus are found in Europe, India and America.

Species:

- Aspidiophorus aster Martin, 1981
- Aspidiophorus bibulbosus Kisielewski, 1979
- Aspidiophorus bisquamosus Mock, 1979
- Aspidiophorus brahmsi Grosso, 1973
- Aspidiophorus gullmarsfjordensis Kånneby & Todaro, 2017
- Aspidiophorus heterodermus Saito, 1937
- Aspidiophorus lamellophorus Balsamo, Hummon, Todaro & Tongiorgi, 1997
- Aspidiophorus lilloensis Grosso & Drahg, 1983
- Aspidiophorus longichaetus Kisielewski, 1986
- Aspidiophorus marinus Remane, 1926
- Aspidiophorus mediterraneus Remane, 1927
- Aspidiophorus microlepidotus d'Hondt, 1978
- Aspidiophorus microsquamatus Saito, 1937
- Aspidiophorus multitubulatus Hummon, 1974
- Aspidiophorus nipponensis Schwank, 1990
- Aspidiophorus oculatus Todaro, Dal Zotto, Maiorova & Adrianov, 2009
- Aspidiophorus oculifer Kisielewski, 1981
- Aspidiophorus ontarionensis Schwank, 1990 [sensu Schwank & Kånneby, 2014]
- Aspidiophorus ophiodermus Balsamo, 1983
- Aspidiophorus ornatus Mock, 1979
- Aspidiophorus paradoxus (Voigt, 1902)
- Aspidiophorus paramediterraneus Hummon, 1974
- Aspidiophorus pleustonicus Kisielewski, 1991
- Aspidiophorus polonicus Kisielewski, 1981
- Aspidiophorus polystictos Balsamo & Todaro, 1987
- Aspidiophorus pori Kisielewski, 1999
- Aspidiophorus schlitzensis Schwank, 1990
- Aspidiophorus semirotundus Saito, 1937
- Aspidiophorus slovinensis Kisielewski, 1986
- Aspidiophorus squamulosus (Roszczak, 1935)
- Aspidiophorus tatraensis Kisielewski, 1986
- Aspidiophorus tentaculatus Wilke, 1954
- Aspidiophorus tetrachaetus Kisielewski, 1986
