= Rhomballichthys =

Scientific classification
- Kingdom: Animalia
- Phylum: Gastrotricha
- Order: Chaetonotida
- Family: Chaetonotidae
- Genus: Rhomballichthys; Schwank, 1990

Genus of microscopic animals

Rhomballichthys is a genus of gastrotrichs belonging to the family Chaetonotidae.

Species:

- Rhomballichthys carinatus Schwank, 1990
- Rhomballichthys murray Schwank, 1990
- Rhomballichthys punctatus (Greuter, 1917)
