= Anacanthoderma =

Scientific classification
- Kingdom: Animalia
- Phylum: Gastrotricha
- Order: Chaetonotida
- Family: Dasydytidae
- Genus: Anacanthoderma; Marcolongo, 1910

Genus of microscopic animals

Anacanthoderma is a genus of gastrotrichs belonging to the family Dasydytidae.

Species:

- Anacanthoderma paucisetosum (Marcolongo, 1910)
- Anacanthoderma punctatum Marcolongo, 1910
