= Proichthydiidae =

Scientific classification
- Kingdom: Animalia
- Phylum: Gastrotricha
- Order: Chaetonotida
- Suborder: Paucitubulatina
- Family: Proichthydiidae; Remane, 1927

Family of gastrotrichs

Proichthydiidae is a family of gastrotrichs belonging to the order Chaetonotida.

Genera:

- Proichthydioides Sudzuki, 1971
- Proichthydium Cordero, 1918
