= Polymerurus =

Scientific classification
- Kingdom: Animalia
- Phylum: Gastrotricha
- Order: Chaetonotida
- Family: Chaetonotidae
- Genus: Polymerurus; Remane, 1927

Genus of microscopic animals

Polymerurus is a genus of gastrotrichs belonging to the family Chaetonotidae.

The genus has almost cosmopolitan distribution.

Species:

- Polymerurus andreae Hochberg, 2005
- Polymerurus biroi (Daday, 1897)
- Polymerurus callosus Brunson, 1950
- Polymerurus corumbensis Kisielewski, 1991
- Polymerurus elongatus (Daday, 1905)
- Polymerurus entzii (Daday, 1882)
- Polymerurus hystrix (Daday, 1910)
- Polymerurus insularis Magpali, Machado, Araújo & Garraffoni, 2021
- Polymerurus longicaudatus (Tatem, 1867)
- Polymerurus magnus Visvesvara, 1963
- Polymerurus nodicaudus (Voigt, 1901)
- Polymerurus nodifurca (Marcolongo, 1910)
- Polymerurus paraelongatus Grosso & Drahg, 1986
- Polymerurus rhomboides (Stokes, 1887)
- Polymerurus serraticaudus (Voigt, 1901)
- Polymerurus squammofurcatus (Preobrajenskaja, 1926)
