= Ptychostomella =

Scientific classification
- Kingdom: Animalia
- Phylum: Gastrotricha
- Order: Macrodasyida
- Family: Thaumastodermatidae
- Genus: Ptychostomella; Remane, 1926

Genus of gastrotrichs

Ptychostomella is a genus of gastrotrichs belonging to the family Thaumastodermatidae.

The species of this genus are found in Europe, Japan.

== Species ==
Ptychostomella contains the following Species:

- Ptychostomella bergensis Clausen, 1996
- Ptychostomella brachycephala (Lévi, 1954)
- Ptychostomella helana Roszczak, 1939
- Ptychostomella higginsi Clausen, 2004
- Ptychostomella jejuensis Lee, Hwang & Chang, 2009
- Ptychostomella lamelliphora Todaro, 2013
- Ptychostomella lepidota Clausen, 2000
- Ptychostomella mediterranea Remane, 1927
- Ptychostomella ommatophora Remane, 1927
- Ptychostomella orientalis Lee & Chang, 2003
- Ptychostomella papillata Lee & Chang, 2003
- Ptychostomella pectinata Remane, 1926
- Ptychostomella sebastiana Araujo & Garraffoni, 2021
- Ptychostomella tyrrhenica Hummon, Todaro & Tongiorgi, 1993
