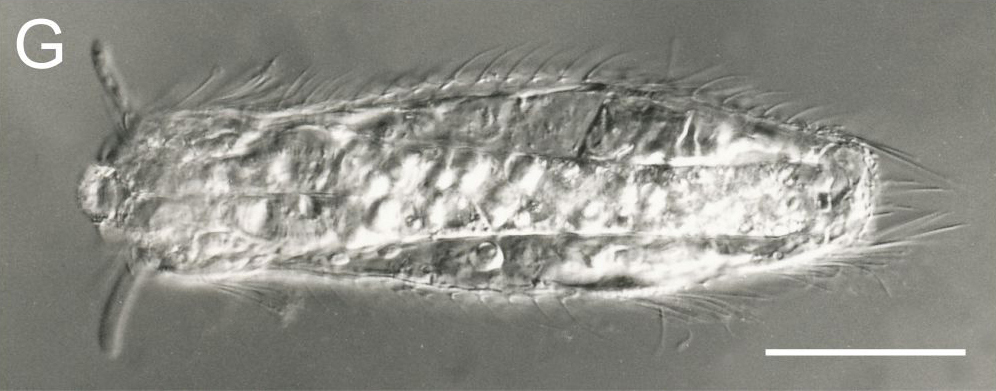
- Neogossea antennigera

Scientific classification
- Kingdom: Animalia
- Phylum: Gastrotricha
- Order: Chaetonotida
- Suborder: Paucitubulatina
- Family: Neogosseidae; Remane, 1927

= Neogosseidae =

Family of gastrotrichs

Neogosseidae is a family of gastrotrichs belonging to the order Chaetonotida.

Genera:

- Kijanebalola Beauchamp, 1932
- Neogossea Remane, 1927
