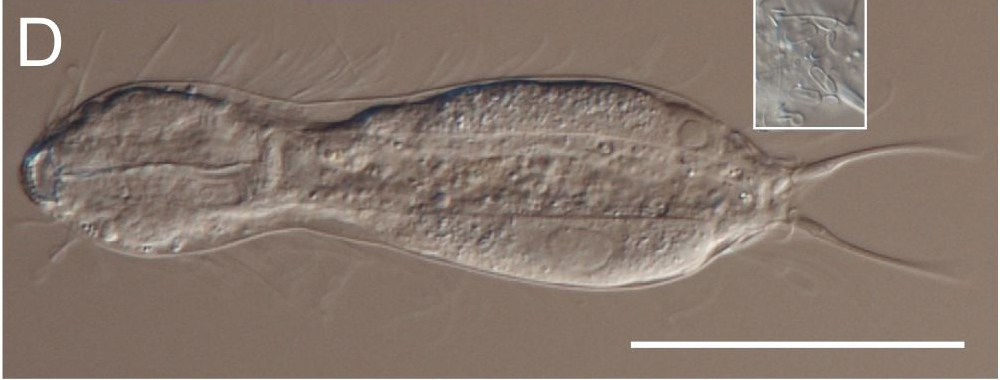
- Ichthydium skandicum

Scientific classification
- Kingdom: Animalia
- Phylum: Gastrotricha
- Order: Chaetonotida
- Family: Chaetonotidae
- Genus: Ichthydium; Ehrenberg, 1830

Synonyms
- List: Euichthydium Schwank, 1990; Forficulichthys Schwank, 1990; Forficulichtys Schwank, 1990; Furficulichthys Schwank, 1990; Ichthidium Schmarda, 1859; Ichthyidium; Icthydium Hudson, 1884; Pseudichthydium Rudescu, 1967

= Ichthydium =

Genus of microscopic animals

Ichthydium is a genus of gastrotrichs belonging to the family Chaetonotidae. The species of this genus are found in Europe.

== Species ==
The following species are recognised in the genus Ichthydium:

- Ichthydium auritum Brunson, 1950
- Ichthydium balatonicum (Varga, 1949)
- Ichthydium bifasciale Schwank, 1990
- Ichthydium bifurcatum Preobrajenskaja, 1926
- Ichthydium brachykolon Brunson, 1947
- Ichthydium cephalobares Brunson, 1947
- Ichthydium chaetiferum (Mueller, 1786) Mueller, 1786
- Ichthydium chaetiferum Kisielewski, 1991
- Ichthydium crassum Daday, 1905
- Ichthydium cyclocephalum Grünspan, 1908
- Ichthydium diacanthum Balsamo & Todaro, 1995
- Ichthydium dubium Preobrajenskaja, 1926
- Ichthydium forcipatum Voigt, 1901
- Ichthydium forficula Remane, 1927
- Ichthydium fossae d'Hondt, 1971
- Ichthydium galeatum Konsuloff, 1921
- Ichthydium jamaicense Schmarda, 1861
- Ichthydium leptum Brunson, 1947
- Ichthydium macrocapitatum Sudzuki, 1971
- Ichthydium macropharyngistum Brunson, 1947
- Ichthydium macrurum Collins, 1918
- Ichthydium malleum Schwank, 1990
- Ichthydium maximum Greuter, 1917
- Ichthydium minimum Brunson, 1950
- Ichthydium palustre Kisielewski, 1981
- Ichthydium pellucidum Preobrajenskaja, 1926
- Ichthydium plicatum Balsamo & Fregni, 1995
- Ichthydium podura (Müller, 1773)
- Ichthydium rostrum Roszczak, 1968
- Ichthydium skandicum Kanneby, Todaro & Jondelius, 2009
- Ichthydium squamigerum Balsamo & Fregni, 1995
- Ichthydium sulcatum (Stokes, 1887)
- Ichthydium tabulatum Schmarda, 1861
- Ichthydium tanytrichum Balsamo, 1983
- Ichthydium tergestinum Grünspan, 1908
- BOLD:ADX8837 (Ichthydium sp.)
