= Pseudostomella =

Scientific classification
- Kingdom: Animalia
- Phylum: Gastrotricha
- Order: Macrodasyida
- Family: Thaumastodermatidae
- Genus: Pseudostomella; Swedmark, 1956

Genus of gastrotrichs

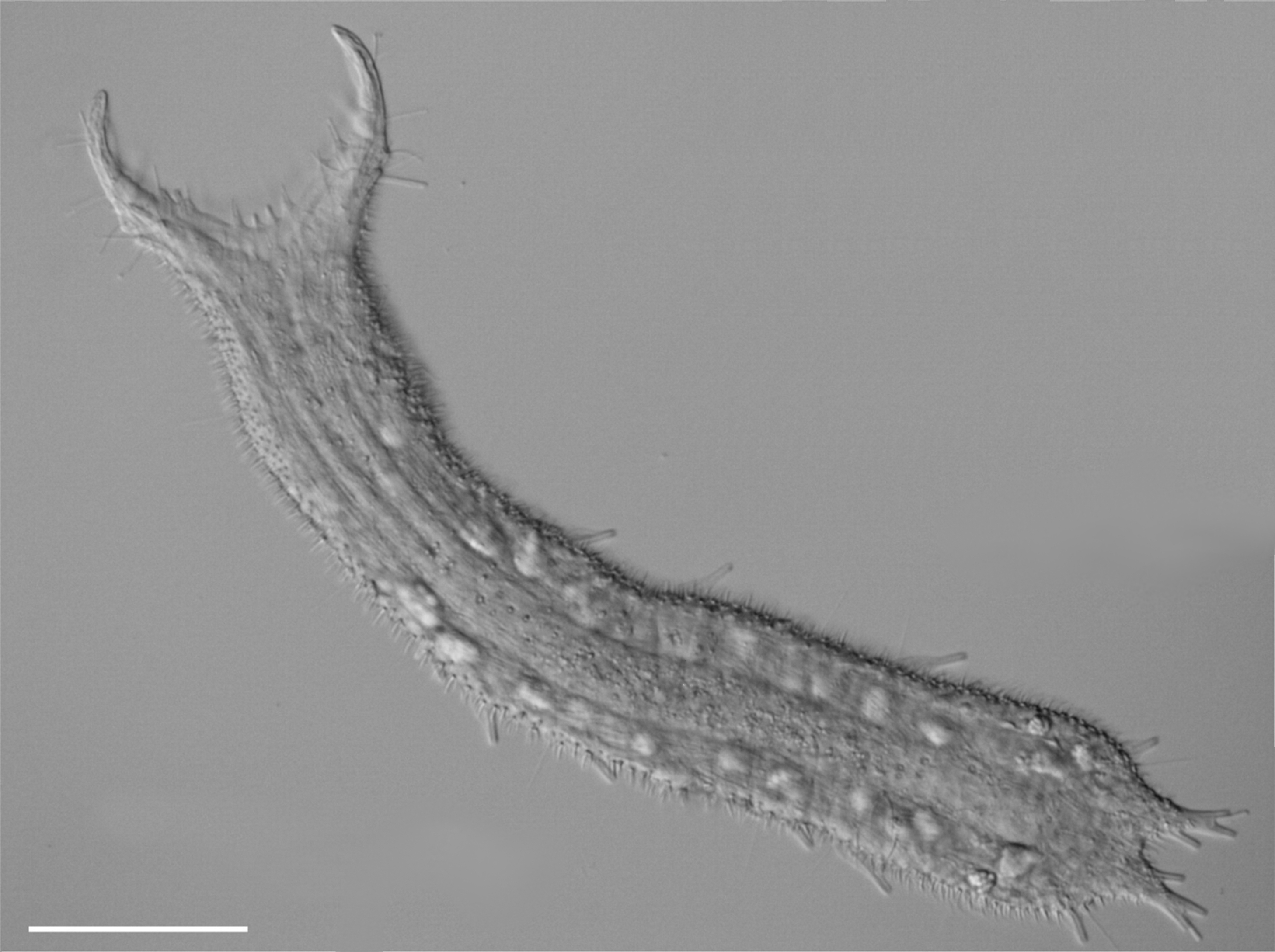
Pseudostomella etrusca

Pseudostomella is a genus of gastrotrichs belonging to the family Thaumastodermatidae.

The genus has almost cosmopolitan distribution.

Species:

- Pseudostomella andamanica Rao, 1993
- Pseudostomella cataphracta Ruppert, 1970
- Pseudostomella cheraensis Priyalakshmi, Menon & Todaro, 2007
- Pseudostomella dolichopoda Todaro, 2012
- Pseudostomella etrusca Hummon, Todaro & Tongiorgi, 1993
- Pseudostomella faroensis Clausen, 2004
- Pseudostomella indica Rao, 1970
- Pseudostomella klauserae Hochberg, 2002
- Pseudostomella koreana Lee & Chang, 2002
- Pseudostomella longifurca Lee & Chang, 2002
- Pseudostomella malayica Renaud-Mornant, 1967
- Pseudostomella mandela Todaro, Perissinotto & Bownes, 2015
- Pseudostomella megapalpator Hochberg, 2002
- Pseudostomella plumosa Ruppert, 1970
- Pseudostomella roscovita Swedmark, 1956
- Pseudostomella squamalongispinosa Araujo, Balsamo & Garraffoni, 2013
- Pseudostomella triancra Hummon, 2008
