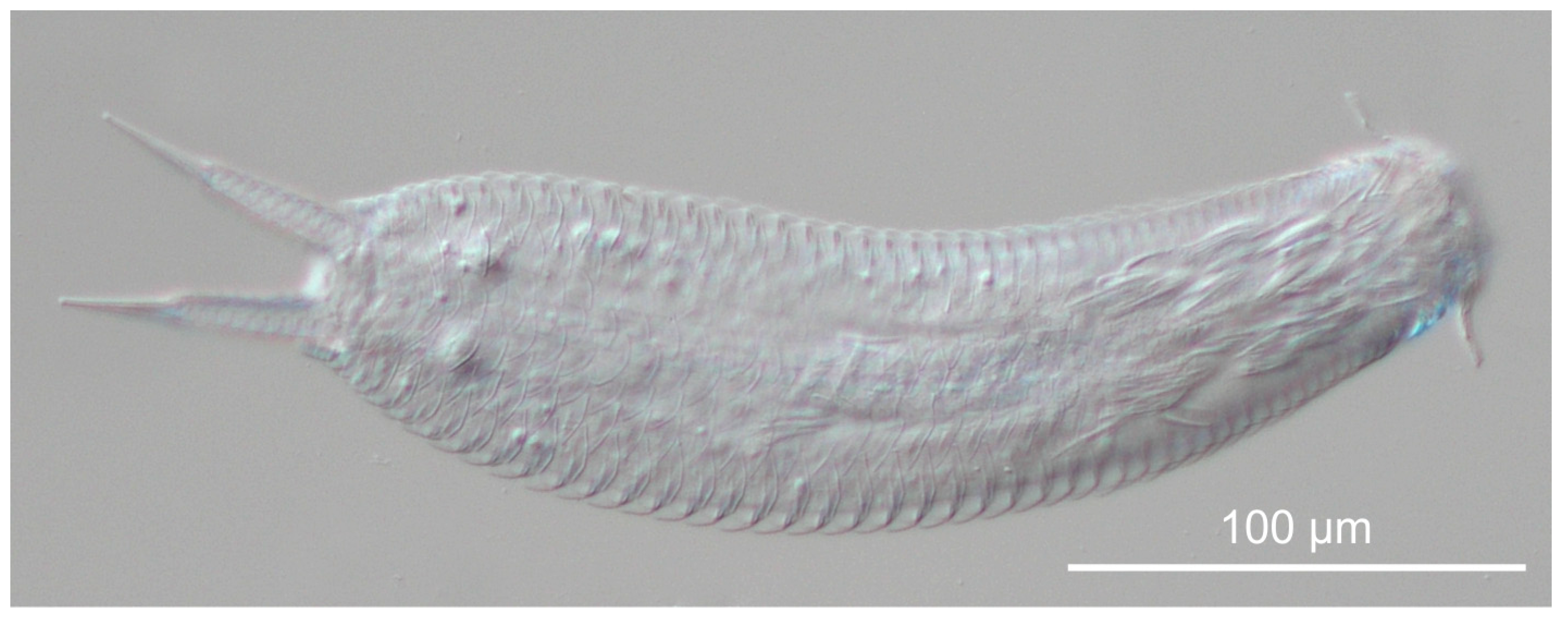
- Photomicrograph of Heteroxenotrichula found at Cap Angela

Scientific classification
- Kingdom: Animalia
- Phylum: Gastrotricha
- Order: Chaetonotida
- Family: Xenotrichulidae
- Subfamily: Xenotrichulinae
- Genus: Heteroxenotrichula; Wilke, 1954

= Heteroxenotrichula =

Genus of gastrotrich

Heteroxenotrichula is a marine genus of Gastrotricha.

The following species are recognized in the genus:

- Heteroxenotrichula affinis (Remane, 1934)
- Heteroxenotrichula arcassonensis Ruppert, 1979
- Heteroxenotrichula pygmaea (Remane, 1934)
- Heteroxenotrichula simplex (Mock, 1979)
- Heteroxenotrichula squamosa Wilke, 1954
- Heteroxenotrichula subterranea (Remane, 1934)
- Heteroxenotrichula texana Todaro, 1994
- Heteroxenotrichula transatlantica Ruppert, 1979
- Heteroxenotrichula tropicalis Araujo, Wieloch, Hochberg & Garraffoni, 2022
- Heteroxenotrichula wilkeae Ruppert, 1979
