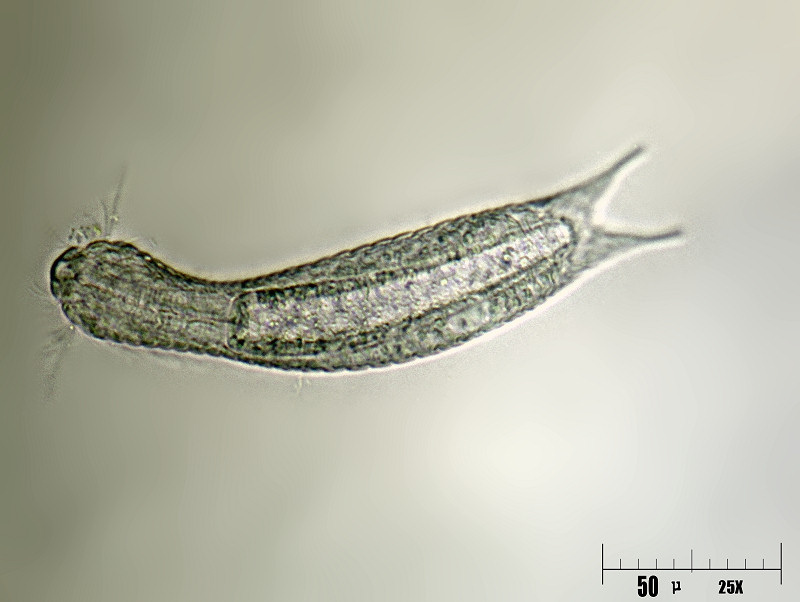
- Lepidodermella squamata

Scientific classification
- Kingdom: Animalia
- Phylum: Gastrotricha
- Order: Chaetonotida
- Family: Chaetonotidae
- Genus: Lepidodermella; Blake, 1933

= Lepidodermella =

Genus of microscopic animals

Lepidodermella is a genus of gastrotrichs belonging to the family Chaetonotidae.

The species of this genus are found in Europe.

Species:

- Lepidodermella acantholepida Suzuki, Makeda & Furuya, 2013
- Lepidodermella amazonica Kisielewski, 1991
- Lepidodermella aspidioformis Sudzuki, 1971
- Lepidodermella broa Kisielewski, 1991
- Lepidodermella forficulata Schwank, 1990 [sensu Schwank & Kånneby, 2014]
- Lepidodermella limogena Schrom, 1972
- Lepidodermella macrocephala d'Hondt, 1971
- Lepidodermella minor (Remane, 1936)
- Lepidodermella polaris Kolicka, Kotwicki & Dabert, 2018
- Lepidodermella serrata Sudzuki, 1971
- Lepidodermella spinifera Tretyakova, 1991
- Lepidodermella squamata (Dujardin, 1841)
- Lepidodermella tabulata (Preobrajenskaja, 1926)
- Lepidodermella triloba (Brunson, 1950)
- Lepidodermella zelinkai (Konsuloff, 1914)
