= Heterolepidoderma =

Scientific classification
- Kingdom: Animalia
- Phylum: Gastrotricha
- Order: Chaetonotida
- Family: Chaetonotidae
- Subfamily: Chaetonotinae
- Genus: Heterolepidoderma; Remane, 1927

Genus of microscopic worms

Heterolepidoderma is a genus of gastrotrichs belonging to the family Chaetonotidae.

The species of this genus are found in Europe and Southern America.

Species:

- Heterolepidoderma acidophilum Kanneby, Todaro & Jondelius, 2012
- Heterolepidoderma arenosum Kisielewski, 1988
