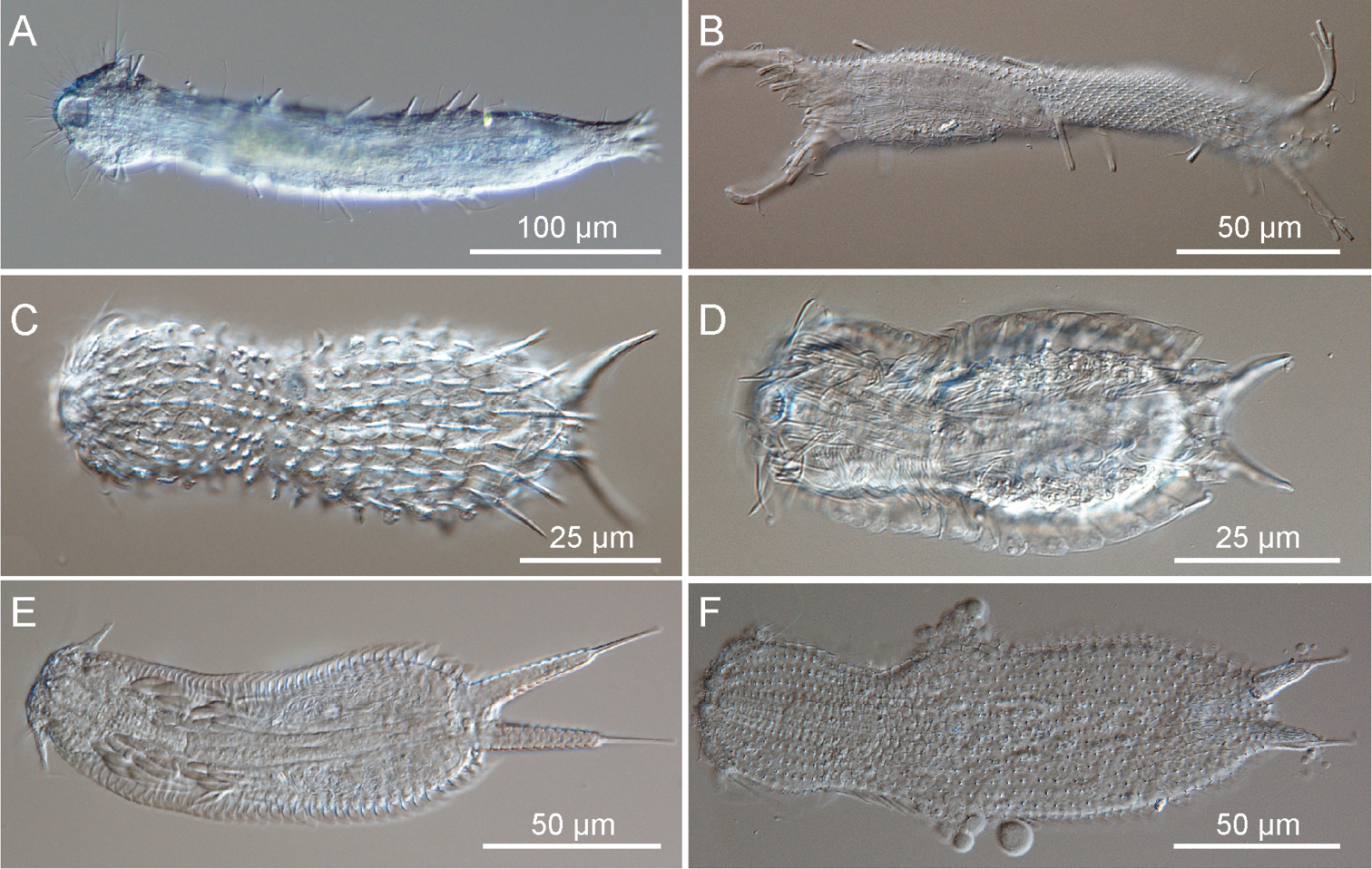

Scientific classification
- Kingdom: Animalia
- Phylum: Gastrotricha
- Order: Chaetonotida
- Suborder: Paucitubulatina
- Family: Xenotrichulidae; Remane, 1927

= Xenotrichulidae =

Family of gastrotrichs

Xenotrichulidae is a family of gastrotrichs belonging to the order Chaetonotida.

Genera:

- Draculiciteria Hummon, 1974
- Heteroxenotrichula Wilke, 1954
- Xenotrichula Remane, 1927
