= Haltidytes =

Scientific classification
- Kingdom: Animalia
- Phylum: Gastrotricha
- Order: Chaetonotida
- Family: Dasydytidae
- Genus: Haltidytes; Remane, 1936

Genus of microscopic animals

Haltidytes is a genus of gastrotrichs belonging to the family Dasydytidae.

The species of this genus are found in Europe and Southern America.

Species:

- Haltidytes crassus (Greuter, 1917)
- Haltidytes festinans (Voigt, 1909)
- Haltidytes ooeides Brunson, 1950
- Haltidytes pseudosquamosus Minowa & Garraffoni, 2017
- Haltidytes saltitans (Stokes, 1888)
- Haltidytes squamosus Kisielewski, 1991
