= Redudasyidae =

Scientific classification
- Kingdom: Animalia
- Phylum: Gastrotricha
- Order: Macrodasyida
- Family: Redudasyidae; Todaro, Dal Zotto, Jondelius, Hochberg, Hummon, Kanneby & Rocha, 2012

Family of gastrotrichs

Redudasyidae is a family of gastrotrichs belonging to the order Macrodasyida.

Genera:

- Anandrodasys Todaro, Dal Zotto, Jondelius, Hochberg, Hummon, Kanneby & Rocha, 2012
- Dolichodasys Gagne, 1977
- Paradasys Remane, 1934
- Redudasys Kisielewski, 1987
