= Dasydytidae =

Scientific classification
- Kingdom: Animalia
- Phylum: Gastrotricha
- Order: Chaetonotida
- Suborder: Paucitubulatina
- Family: Dasydytidae von Daday, 1905

Family of microscopic worms

Dasydytidae is a family of gastrotrichs in the order Chaetonotida.

== Genera ==
- Anacanthoderma Marcolongo, 1910
- Chitonodytes Remane, 1936
- Dasydytes Gosse, 1851
- Haltidytes Remane, 1936
- Ornamentula Kisielewski, 1991
- Setopus Grünspan, 1908
- Stylochaeta Hlava, 1904
