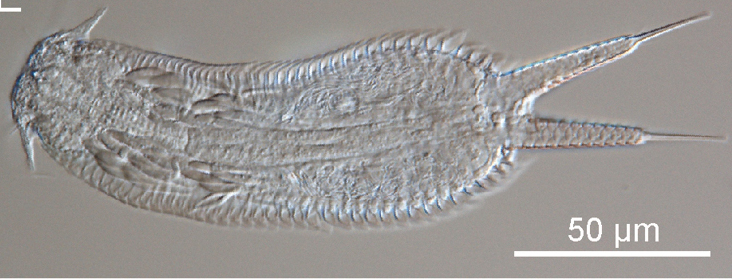
- Heteroxenotrichula squamosa

Scientific classification
- Kingdom: Animalia
- Phylum: Gastrotricha
- Order: Chaetonotida
- Suborder: Paucitubulatina d’Hondt, 1971

= Paucitubulatina =

Suborder of gastrotrichs in the order Chaetonotida

Paucitubulatina is a suborder of gastrotrichs in the order Chaetonotida.

== Families ==
- Chaetonotidae Gosse, 1864 sensu Leasi & Todaro, 2008
- Dasydytidae von Daday, 1905
- Dichaeturidae Remane, 1927
- Muselliferidae Leasi & Todaro, 2008
- Neogosseidae Remane, 1927
- Proichthydiidae Remane, 1927
- Xenotrichulidae Remane, 1927
