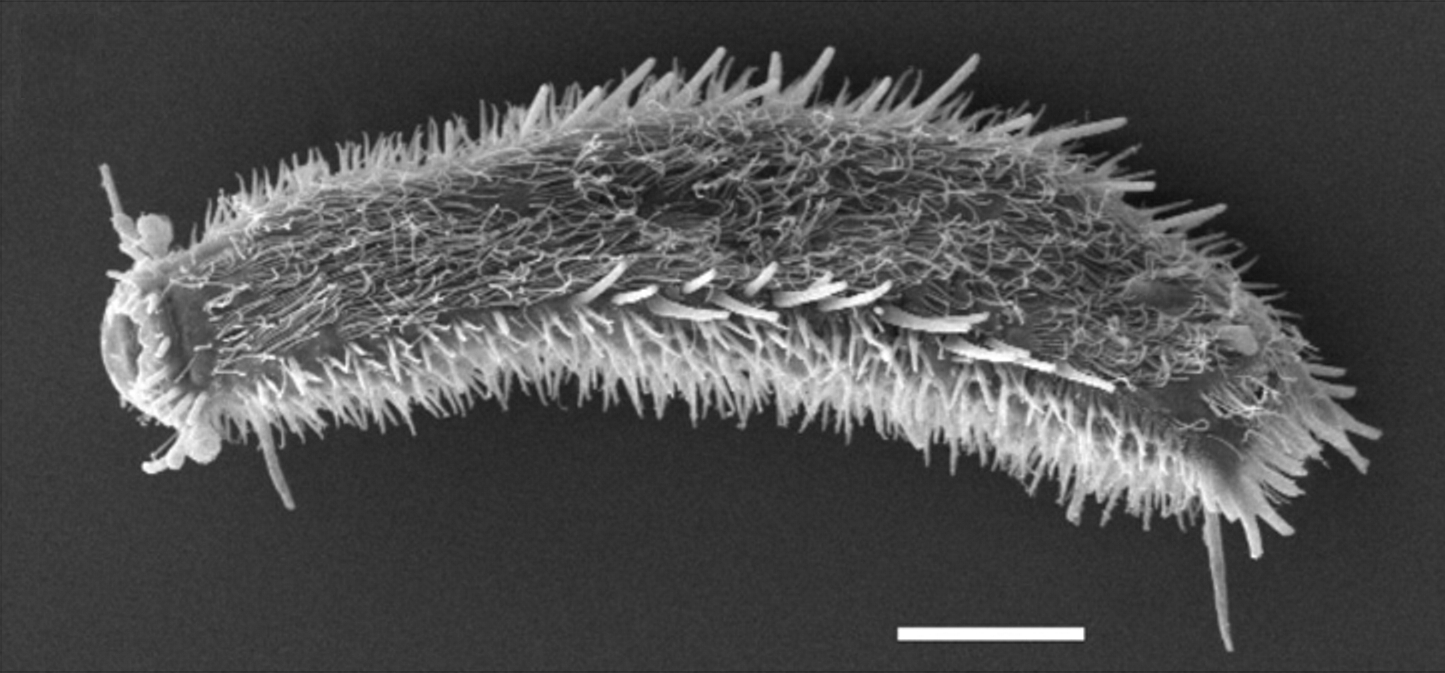
- Thaumastoderma ramuliferum

Scientific classification
- Kingdom: Animalia
- Phylum: Gastrotricha
- Order: Macrodasyida
- Family: Thaumastodermatidae; Remane, 1927

= Thaumastodermatidae =

Family of gastrotrichs

Thaumastodermatidae is a family of gastrotrichs belonging to the order Macrodasyida.

== Subfamilies and genera ==
Subfamilies and genera:

- Diplodasyinae Ruppert, 1978
  - Acanthodasys Remane, 1927
  - Diplodasys Remane, 1927
- Thaumastodermatinae Remane, 1927
  - Chimaeradasys Kieneke & Todaro, 2020
  - Hemidasys Claparède, 1867
  - Oregodasys Hummon, 2008
  - Pseudostomella Swedmark, 1956
  - Ptychostomella Remane, 1926
  - Tetranchyroderma Remane, 1926
  - Thaumastoderma Remane, 1926
