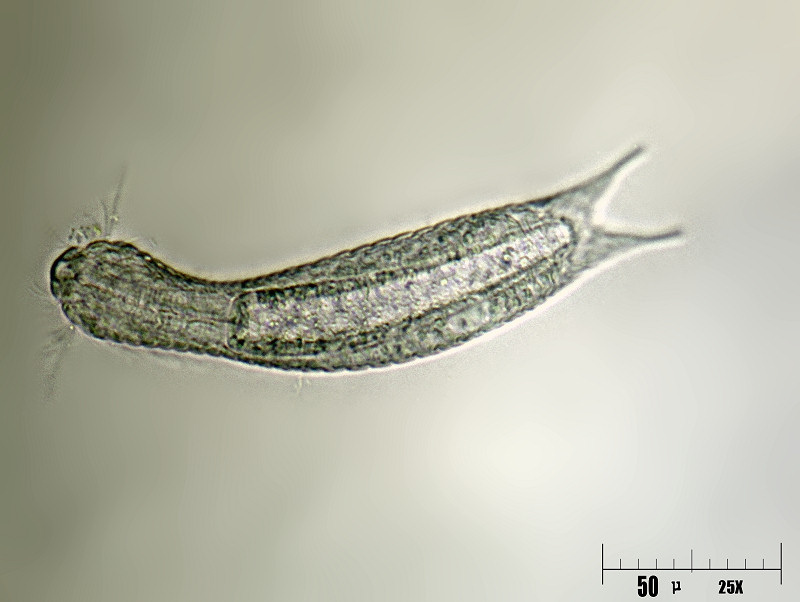
- Lepidodermella squamata

Scientific classification
- Kingdom: Animalia
- Phylum: Gastrotricha
- Order: Chaetonotida
- Suborder: Paucitubulatina
- Family: Chaetonotidae; Gosse, 1864

Subfamilies
- Chaetonotinae; Undulinae

= Chaetonotidae =

Family of gastrotrichs

Chaetonotidae is a family of gastrotrichs in the order Chaetonotida. It is the largest family of gastrotrichs with almost 400 species, some of which are marine and some freshwater. Current classification is largely based on shape and external structures but these are highly variable. Molecular studies show a high level of support for a clade containing Dasydytidae nested within Chaetonotidae.

== Genera ==
The following genera are included in the family Chaetonotidae according to the World Register of Marine Species:

- Subfamily Chaetonotinae Kisielewski, 1991

- Genus Arenotus Kisielewski, 1987

- Arenotus strixinoi Kisielewski, 1987

- Genus Aspidiophorus Voigt, 1903
- Genus Caudichthydium Schwank, 1990
- Genus Chaetonotus Ehrenberg, 1830
- Genus Fluxiderma d'Hondt, 1974
- Genus Halichaetonotus Remane, 1936
- Genus Heterolepidoderma Remane, 1926
- Genus Ichthydium Ehrenberg, 1830
- Genus Lepidochaetus Kisielewski, 1991
- Genus Lepidoderma
- Genus Lepidodermella Blake, 1933
- Genus Polymerurus Remane, 1927
- Genus Rhomballichthys Schwank, 1990
- Genus Chitonodytes
- Genus Hemichaetonotus
- Genus Pseudichthydium

- Subfamily Undulinae Kisielewski, 1991

- Genus Undula Kisielewski, 1991
