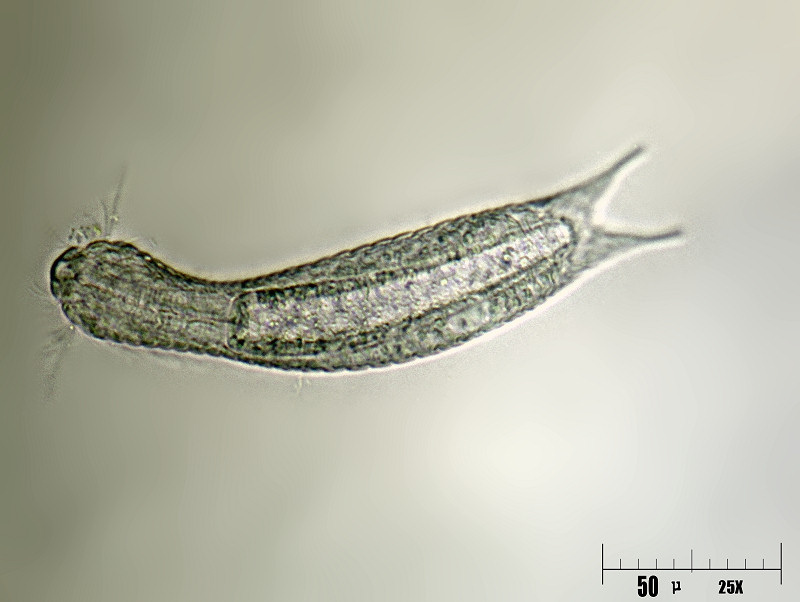

Scientific classification
- Kingdom: Animalia
- Phylum: Gastrotricha
- Order: Chaetonotida
- Family: Chaetonotidae
- Genus: Lepidodermella
- Species: L. squamata

Binomial name
- Lepidodermella squamata (Dujardin, 1841)

Synonyms
- Lepidodermella squamatus; Lepidodermella squammata; Lepidodermella squammatus

= Lepidodermella squamata =

Species of microscopic worm

Lepidodermella squamata is a freshwater species of minute worm in the phylum Gastrotricha.

== Description ==
Lepidodermella squamata is a small worm-like organism growing to a length of 190 μm (0.007 inch). It is roughly cylindrical with a head, a slightly narrower neck, and a slightly wider and much longer body ending with a forked tail. There are two adhesive suckers on the posterior end. The surface of the trunk is covered in scales. There are tufts of bristles on the head and two rows of cilia on the ventral surface of the body.

== Distribution and habitat ==
Lepidodermella squamata is found in North and South America, Japan and much of Europe. It is a freshwater species and is found on the surface of water plants in lakes, ponds, streams and marshes. It is also found between the particles of sediment at the bottom of the water body.

== Biology ==
Lepidodermella squamata feeds on algae, bacteria and detritus. It glides across the substrate by means of the cilia on its ventral surface. Development is direct and growth is rapid. A few days after hatching it develops both male and female reproductive organs. About four eggs are laid over the course of a few days, however these develop without fertilisation. In adverse conditions, the eggs can survive desiccation and freezing.

== Systematics ==
The phylogenetic relationships of the Gastrotricha are still unclear: Morphological studies place Gastrostricha near the Gnathostomulida, the Rotifera or the Nematoda. Molecular data have shown that the Gastrotricha are sister taxon to the Platyhelminthes. Later studies have placed them elsewhere, including close to the Ecdysozoa or the Lophotrochozoa.
