= Turbanellidae =

Scientific classification
- Kingdom: Animalia
- Phylum: Gastrotricha
- Order: Macrodasyida
- Family: Turbanellidae

Family of gastrotrichs

Turbanellidae is a family of gastrotrichs belonging to the order Macrodasyida.

Genera:

- Desmodasys Clausen, 1965
- Dinodasys Remane, 1927
- Marinellina Ruttner-Kolisko, 1955
- Paraturbanella Remane, 1927
- Prostobucantia Evans & Hummon, 1991
- Prostobuccantia Evans & Hummon, 1991
- Pseudoturbanella d'Hondt, 1968
- Turbanella Schultze, 1853
