= Neodasys =

Scientific classification
- Kingdom: Animalia
- Phylum: Gastrotricha
- Order: Chaetonotida
- Suborder: Multitubulatina d’Hondt, 1971
- Family: Neodasyidae; Remane, 1929
- Genus: Neodasys; Remane, 1927

Genus of gastrotrichs in the family Neodasyidae

Neodasys is a marine and hermaphroditic genus of gastrotrichs, with a worm-shaped body and lateral adhesive tubes, in the class Chaetonotida. It is the only genus in the family Neodasyidae, which is the only family in the suborder Multitubulatina.

== Species ==
- Neodasys chaetonotoideus Remane, 1927
- Neodasys cirritus Evans, 1992
- Neodasys uchidai Remane, 1961
