= Marinellina =

Scientific classification
- Kingdom: Animalia
- Phylum: Gastrotricha
- Order: Macrodasyida
- Family: Turbanellidae
- Genus: Marinellina
- Species: M. flagellata

Binomial name
- Marinellina flagellata Ruttner-Kolisko, 1955

Genus of microscopic animals

Marinellina is a monotypic genus of gastrotrichs belonging to the family Turbanellidae.

Its only species is Marinellina flagellata, which is found in Southern America.
