= Chitonodytes =

Scientific classification
- Kingdom: Animalia
- Phylum: Gastrotricha
- Order: Chaetonotida
- Family: Dasydytidae
- Genus: Chitonodytes; Remane, 1936

Genus of microscopic animals

Chitonodytes is a genus of gastrotrichs belonging to the family Dasydytidae.

Species:

- Chitonodytes collini (Remane, 1927)
- Chitonodytes longisetosus (Metschnikoff, 1865)
- Chitonodytes longispinosus (Greuter, 1917)
