= Dactylopodolidae =

- Dactylopodola australiensis, ventral view.

Scientific classification
- Kingdom: Animalia
- Phylum: Gastrotricha
- Order: Macrodasyida
- Family: Dactylopodolidae; Strand, 1929

Family of gastrotrichs

Dactylopodolidae is a family of gastrotrichs belonging to the order Macrodasyida.

Genera:

- Dactylopodola Strand, 1929
- Dendrodasys Wilke, 1954
- Dendropodola Hummon, Todaro & Tongiorgi, 1993
