= Lepidodasys =

Scientific classification
- Kingdom: Animalia
- Phylum: Gastrotricha
- Order: Macrodasyida
- Family: Lepidodasyidae
- Genus: Lepidodasys; Remane, 1926

Genus of gastrotrichs

Lepidodasys is a genus of gastrotrichs belonging to the order Macrodasyida. It is the only member of the family Lepidodasyidae.

== Species ==
Lepidodasys contains the following species:

- Lepidodasys arcolepis Clausen, 2004
- Lepidodasys castoroides Clausen, 2004
- Lepidodasys laeviacus Lee & Chang, 2011
- Lepidodasys ligni Hochberg, Atherton & Gross, 2013
- Lepidodasys martini Remane, 1926
- Lepidodasys platyurus Remane, 1927
- Lepidodasys tsushimaensis Lee & Chang, 2011
- Lepidodasys unicarenatus Balsamo, Fregni & Tongiorgi, 1994
- Lepidodasys worsaae Hochberg & Atherton, 2011
