= Macrodasyidae =

Scientific classification
- Kingdom: Animalia
- Phylum: Gastrotricha
- Order: Macrodasyida
- Family: Macrodasyidae

Family of gastrotrichs

Macrodasyidae is a family of gastrotrichs belonging to the order Macrodasyida.

Genera:

- Kryptodasys Todaro, Dal Zotto, Kånneby & Hochberg, 2019
- Macrodasys Remane, 1924
- Thaidasys Todaro, Dal Zotto & Leasi, 2015
- Urodasys Remane, 1926
