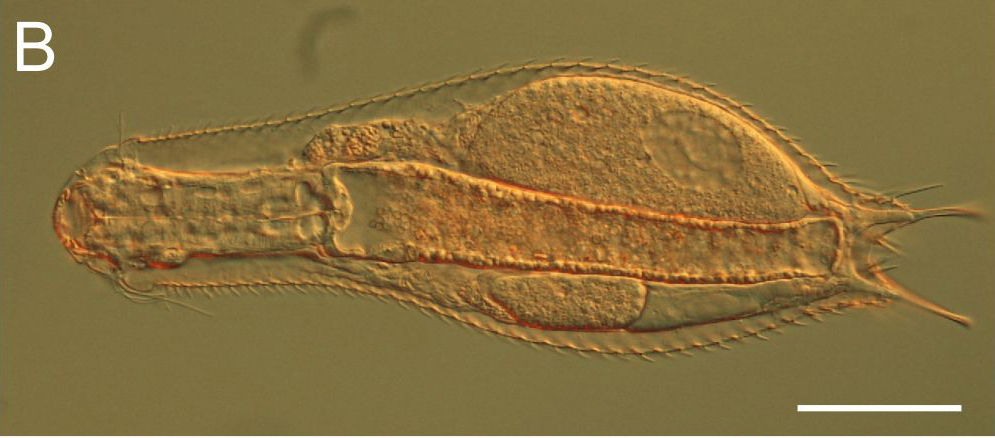
- Chaetonotus (Chaetonotus) polyspinosus

Scientific classification
- Domain: Eukaryota
- Kingdom: Animalia
- Phylum: Gastrotricha
- Order: Chaetonotida
- Family: Chaetonotidae
- Subfamily: Chaetonotinae
- Genus: Chaetonotus; Ehrenberg, 1830

Subgenera
- Chaetonotus (Bifasciculatella); Chaetonotus (Chaetonotus); Chaetonotus (Diversichaetatella); Chaetonotus (Hystricochaetonotus); Chaetonotus (Marinochaetus); Chaetonotus (Schizochaetonotus); Chaetonotus (Wolterecka); Chaetonotus (Zonochaeta); Chaetonotus (unknown)

= Chaetonotus =

Genus of microscopic worms

Chaetonotus is a genus of gastrotrichs in the family Chaetonotidae
