= Planodasyidae =

Scientific classification
- Kingdom: Animalia
- Phylum: Gastrotricha
- Order: Macrodasyida
- Family: Planodasyidae; Rao & Clausen, 1970

Family of gastrotrichs

Planodasyidae is a family of gastrotrichs belonging to the order Macrodasyida.

Genera:

- Crasiella Clausen, 1968
- Megadasys Schmidt, 1974
- Planodasys Rao, 1970
