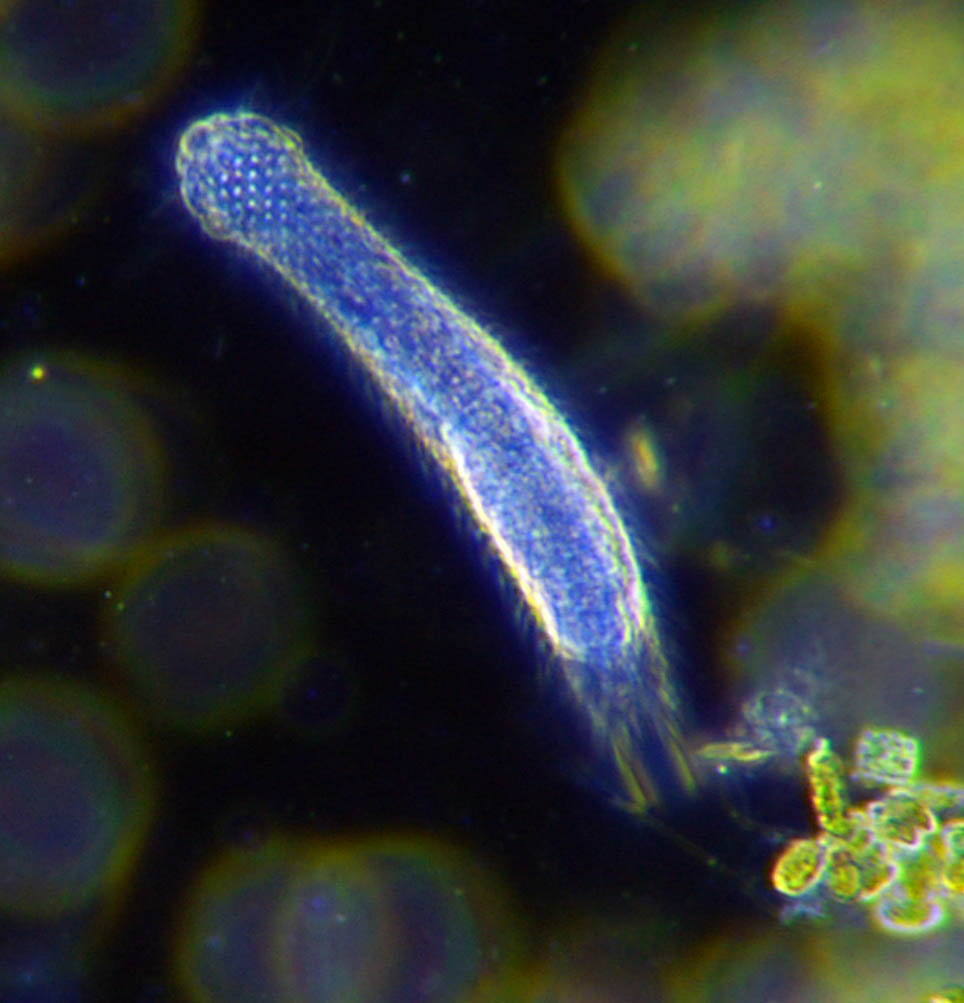
- Dark-field photograph of a gastrotrich
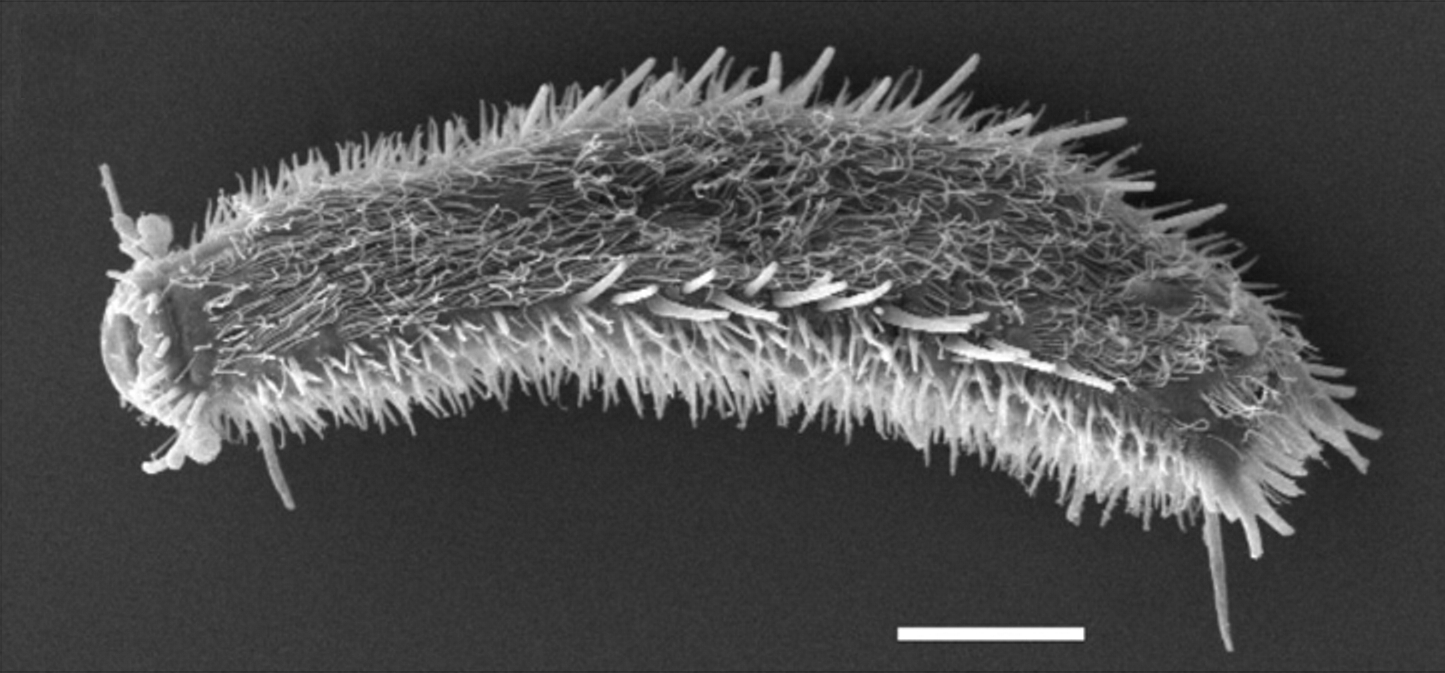
- Scanning electron micrograph of Thaumastoderma ramuliferum

Scientific classification
- Kingdom: Animalia
- Subkingdom: Eumetazoa
- Clade: ParaHoxozoa
- Clade: Bilateria
- Clade: Nephrozoa
- Clade: Protostomia
- Clade: Spiralia
- Clade: Rouphozoa
- Phylum: Gastrotricha; Metschnikoff, 1865

Orders
- Chaetonotida; Macrodasyida

= Gastrotrich =

Phylum of microscopic animals

The gastrotrichs (phylum Gastrotricha), commonly referred to as hairybellies or hairybacks, are a group of microscopic (0.06–3.0 mm), cylindrical, acoelomate animals, and are widely distributed and abundant in freshwater and marine environments. They are mostly benthic and live within the periphyton, the layer of tiny organisms and detritus that is found on the seabed and the beds of other water bodies. The majority live on and between particles of sediment or on other submerged surfaces, but a few species are terrestrial and live on land in the film of water surrounding grains of soil. Gastrotrichs are divided into two orders, the Macrodasyida which are marine (except for two species), and the Chaetonotida, some of which are marine and some freshwater. As of 2019, more than 860 species of gastrotrichs have been described.

Gastrotrichs have a simple body plan with a head region, with a brain and sensory organs, and a trunk with a simple gut and the reproductive organs. They have adhesive glands with which they can anchor themselves to the substrate and cilia with which they move around. They feed on detritus, sucking up organic particles with their muscular pharynx. They are hermaphrodites, the marine species producing eggs which develop directly into miniature adults. The freshwater species are parthenogenetic, producing unfertilised eggs, and at least one species is viviparous. Gastrotrichs mature with great rapidity and have lifespans of only a few days.

== Etymology and taxonomy ==
The name "gastrotrich" comes from Greek γαστήρ, gaster 'stomach' and θρίξ, thrix 'hair'. The name was coined by the Russian zoologist Élie Metchnikoff in 1865. The common name "hairyback" seems like a calque of "Chaetonotida", (χαίτη (khaítē), lit. "hair", νῶτον (nôton), "back") the largest and most common order, although, in the original description, an etymology is not provided. It could also be a mistranslation of the name of the phylum.

The relationship of gastrotrichs to other phyla is unclear. Morphology suggests that they are close to the Gnathostomulida, the Rotifera, or the Nematoda. On the other hand, genetic studies place them as close relatives of the Platyhelminthes, the Ecdysozoa or the Lophotrochozoa. As of 2019, more than 860 species have been described. The phylum contains a single class, divided into two orders: the Macrodasyida and the Chaetonotida. Edward Ruppert et al. report that the Macrodasyida are wholly marine, but two rare and poorly known species, Marinellina flagellata and Redudasys fornerise, are known from fresh water. The Chaetonotida comprises both marine and freshwater species.

== Anatomy ==
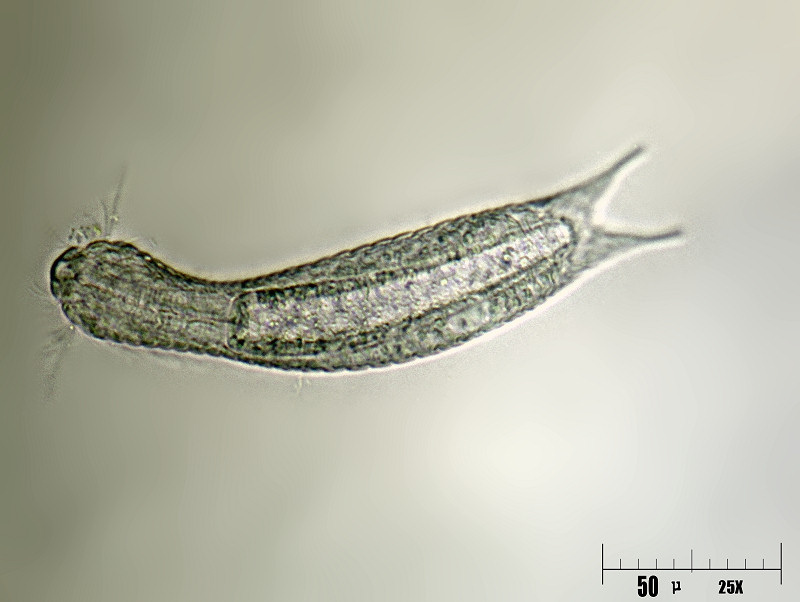
Lepidodermella squamata (Chaetonotida)

Gastrotrichs vary in size from about 0.06 to 3 mm (0.002 to 0.118 in) in body length. They are bilaterally symmetrical, with a transparent strap-shaped or bowling pin-shaped body, arched on the upper surface and flattened on the underside. The anterior end is not clearly defined as a head but contains the sense organs, brain and pharynx. Cilia are found around the mouth and on the ventral surface of the head and body. The trunk contains the gut and the reproductive organs. At the posterior end of the body are two projections with cement glands that serve in adhesion. This is a double-gland system where one gland secretes the glue and another secretes a de-adhesive agent to sever the connection. In the Macrodasyida, there are additional adhesive glands at the anterior end and on the sides of the body.

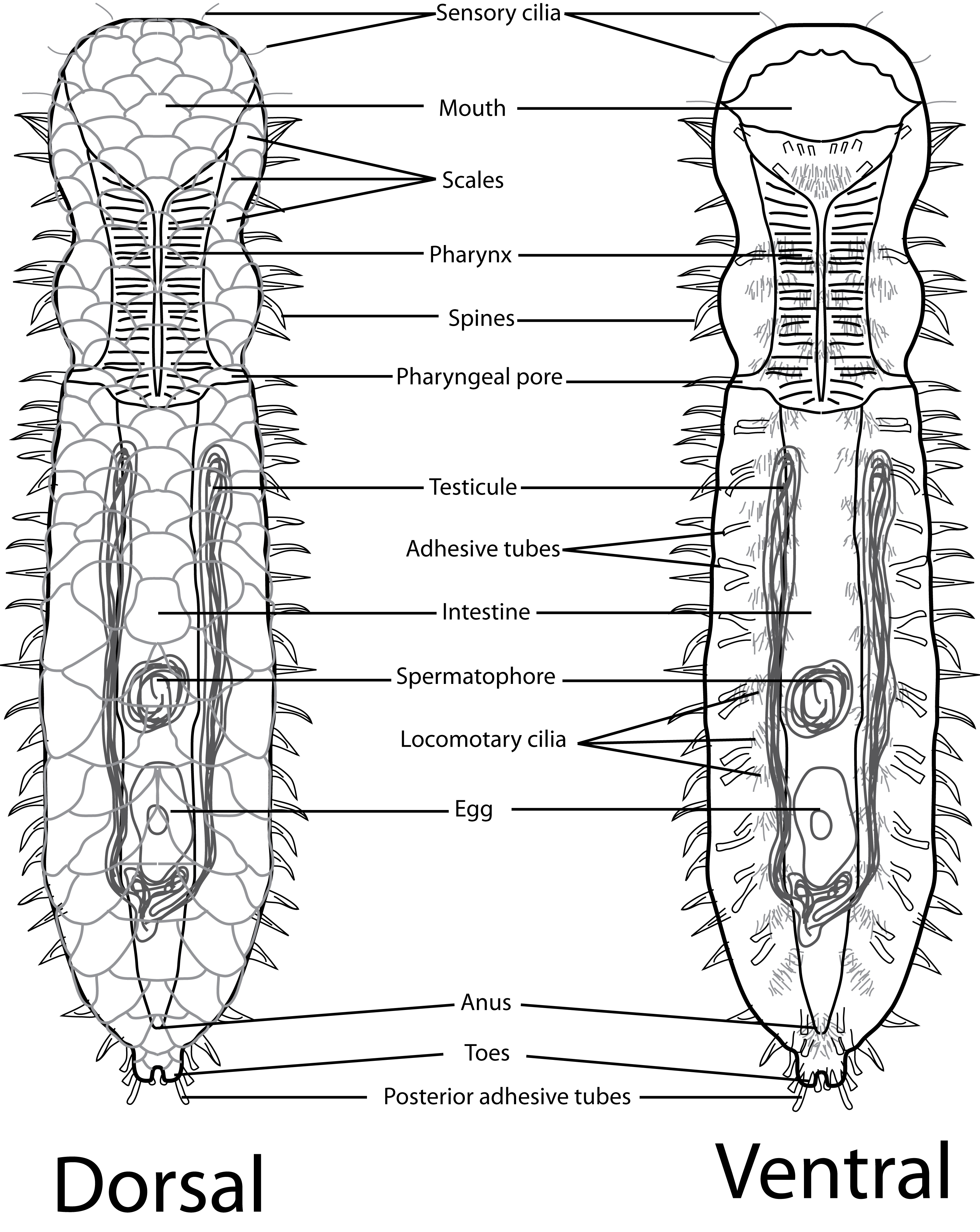
Diplodasys rothei

The body wall consists of a cuticle, an epidermis and longitudinal and circular bands of muscle fibres. In some primitive species, each epidermal cell has a single cilium, a feature shared only by the gnathostomulans. The whole ventral surface of the animal may be ciliated or the cilia may be arranged in rows, patches or transverse bands. The cuticle is locally thickened in some gastrotrichs and forms scales, hooks and spines. There is no coelom (body cavity) and the interior of the animal is filled with poorly differentiated connective tissue. In the macrodasyidans, Y-shaped cells, each containing a vacuole, surround the gut and may function as a hydrostatic skeleton.

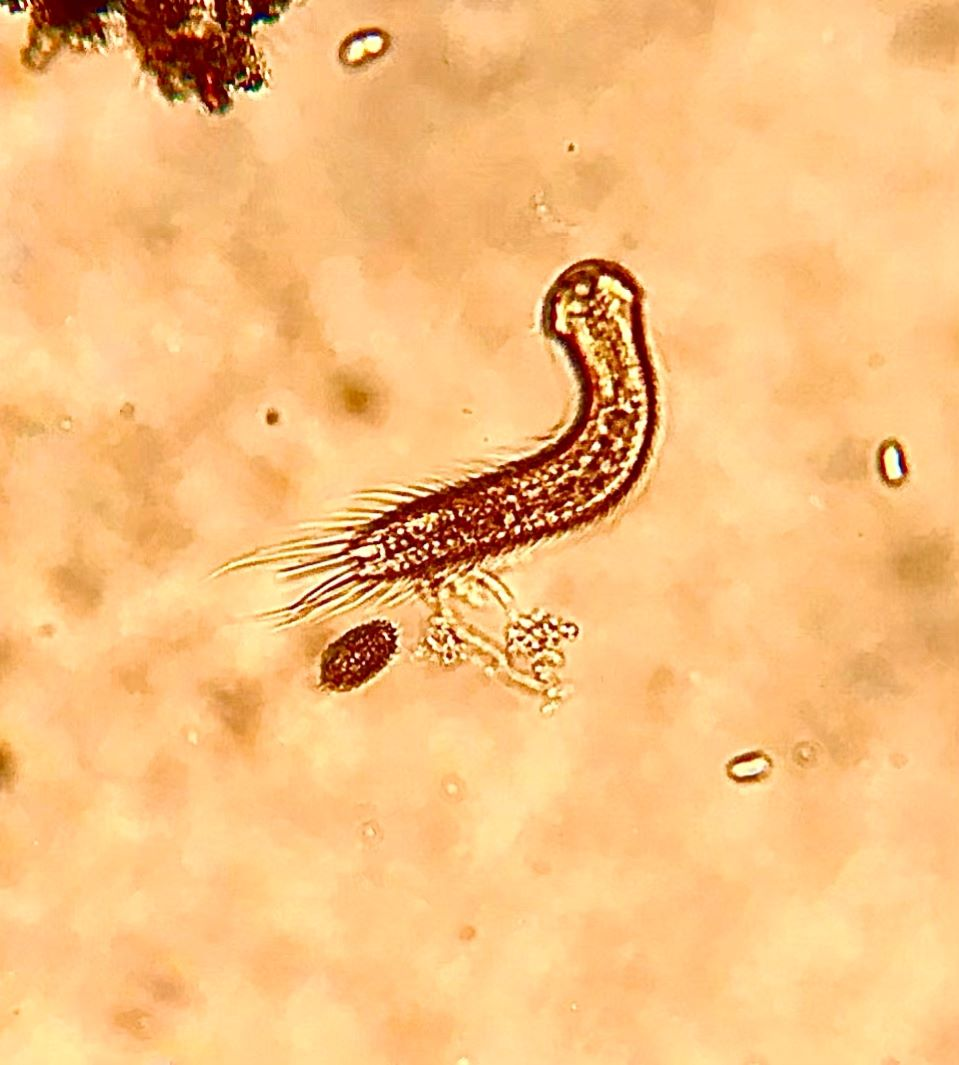
Lepidochaetus zelinkai

The mouth is at the anterior end and opens into an elongated muscular pharynx with a triangular or Y-shaped lumen, lined by myoepithelial cells. The pharynx opens into a cylindrical intestine, which is lined with glandular and digestive cells. The anus is located on the ventral surface close to the posterior of the body. In some species, there are pores in the pharynx opening to the ventral surface; these contain valves and may allow egestion of any excess water swallowed while feeding.

In the chaetonotidans, the excretory system consists of a single pair of protonephridia, which open through separate pores on the lateral underside of the animal, usually in the midsection of the body. In the macrodasyidans, there are several pairs of these opening along the side of the body. Nitrogenous waste is probably excreted through the body wall, as part of respiration, and the protonephridia are believed to function mainly in osmoregulation. Unusually, the protonephridia do not take the form of flame cells, but, instead, the excretory cells consist of a skirt surrounding a series of cytoplasmic rods that in turn enclose a central flagellum. These cells, termed cyrtocytes, connect to a single outlet cell which passes the excreted material into the protonephridial duct.

As is typical for such small animals, there are no respiratory or circulatory organs. The nervous system is relatively simple. The brain consists of two ganglia, one on either side of the pharynx, connected by a commissure. From these lead a pair of nerve cords which run along either side of the body beside the longitudinal muscle bands. The primary sensory organs are the bristles and ciliated tufts of the body surface which function as mechanoreceptors. There are also ciliated pits on the head, simple ciliary photoreceptors and fleshy appendages which act as chemoreceptors.

== Distribution and habitat ==
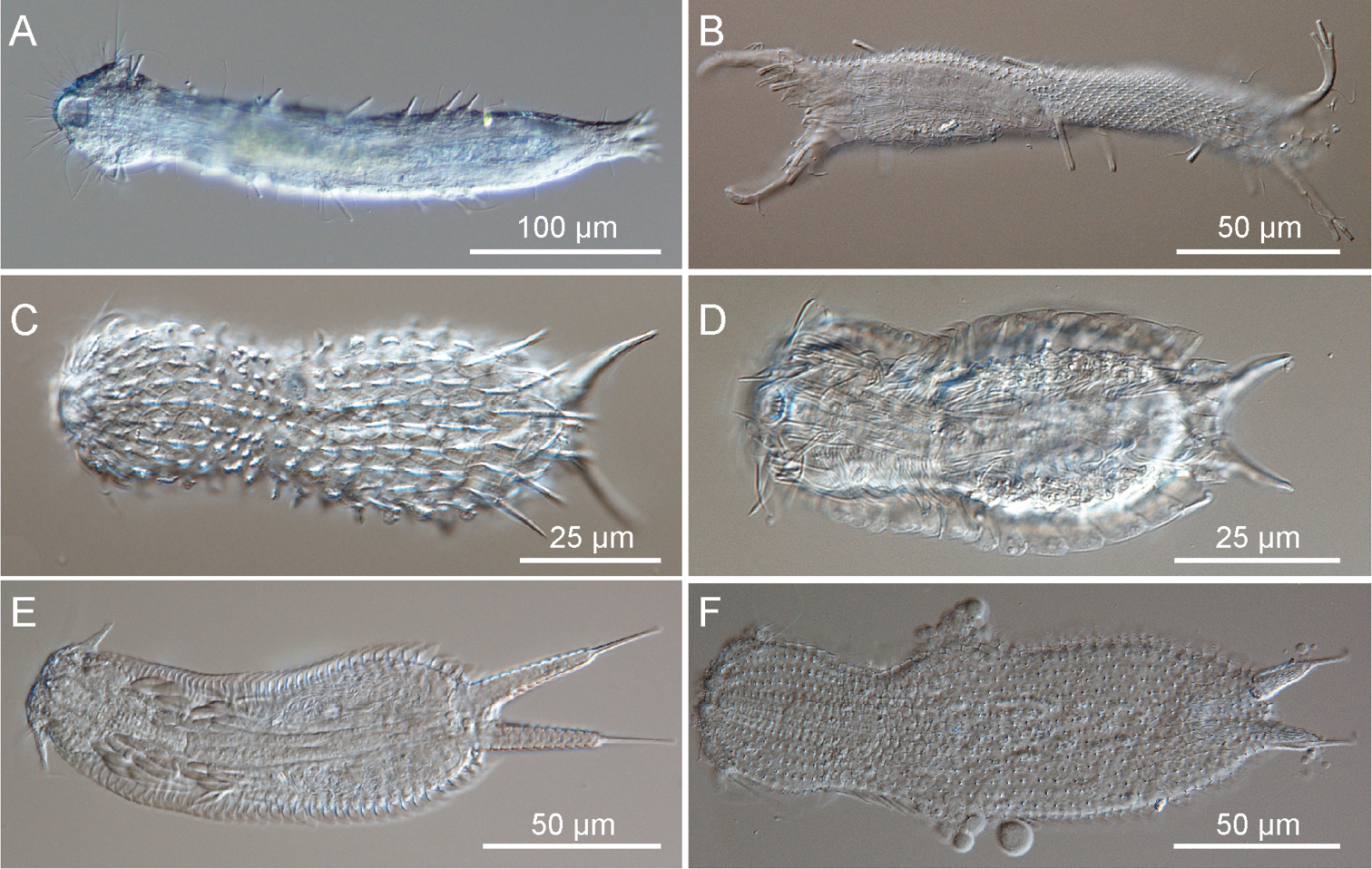
A & B = Macrodasyida C, D, E & F = Chaetonotida

Gastrotrichs are cosmopolitan in distribution. They inhabit the interstitial spaces between particles in marine and freshwater environments, the surfaces of aquatic plants and other submerged objects and the surface film of water surrounding soil particles on land. A very few species can also live in the water column as planktonic animals. They are also found in stagnant pools and anaerobic mud, where they thrive even in the presence of hydrogen sulfide. When pools dry up they can survive periods of desiccation as eggs, and some species are capable of forming cysts in harsh conditions. In marine sediments they have been known to reach 364 individuals per 10 cm^{2} (1.6 sq in) making them the third most common invertebrate in the sediment after nematodes and harpacticoid copepods. In freshwater they may reach a density of 158 individuals per 10 cm^{2} (1.6 sq in) and are the fifth most abundant group of invertebrates in the sediment.

== Behaviour and ecology ==
In marine and freshwater environments, gastrotrichs form part of the benthic community. They are detritivores and are microphagous: they feed by sucking small dead or living organic materials, diatoms, bacteria and small protozoa into their mouths by the muscular action of the pharynx. They are themselves eaten by turbellarians and other small macrofauna.

Like many microscopic animals, gastrotrich locomotion is primarily powered by hydrostatics, but movement occurs through different methods in different members of the group. Chaetonotids only have adhesive glands at the back and, in them, locomotion typically proceeds in a smooth gliding manner; the whole body is propelled forward by the rhythmic action of the cilia on the ventral surface. In the pelagic chaetonotid genus Stylochaeta, however, movement proceeds in jerks as the long, muscle-activated spines are forced rhythmically towards the side of the body. By contrast, with chaetonotids, macrodasyidans typically have multiple adhesive glands and move forward with a creeping action similar to that of a "looper" caterpillar. In response to a threat, the head and trunk can be rapidly pulled backwards, or the creeping movement can be reversed. Muscular action is important when the animal turns sideways and during copulation, when two individuals twine around each other.

== Reproduction and lifespan ==
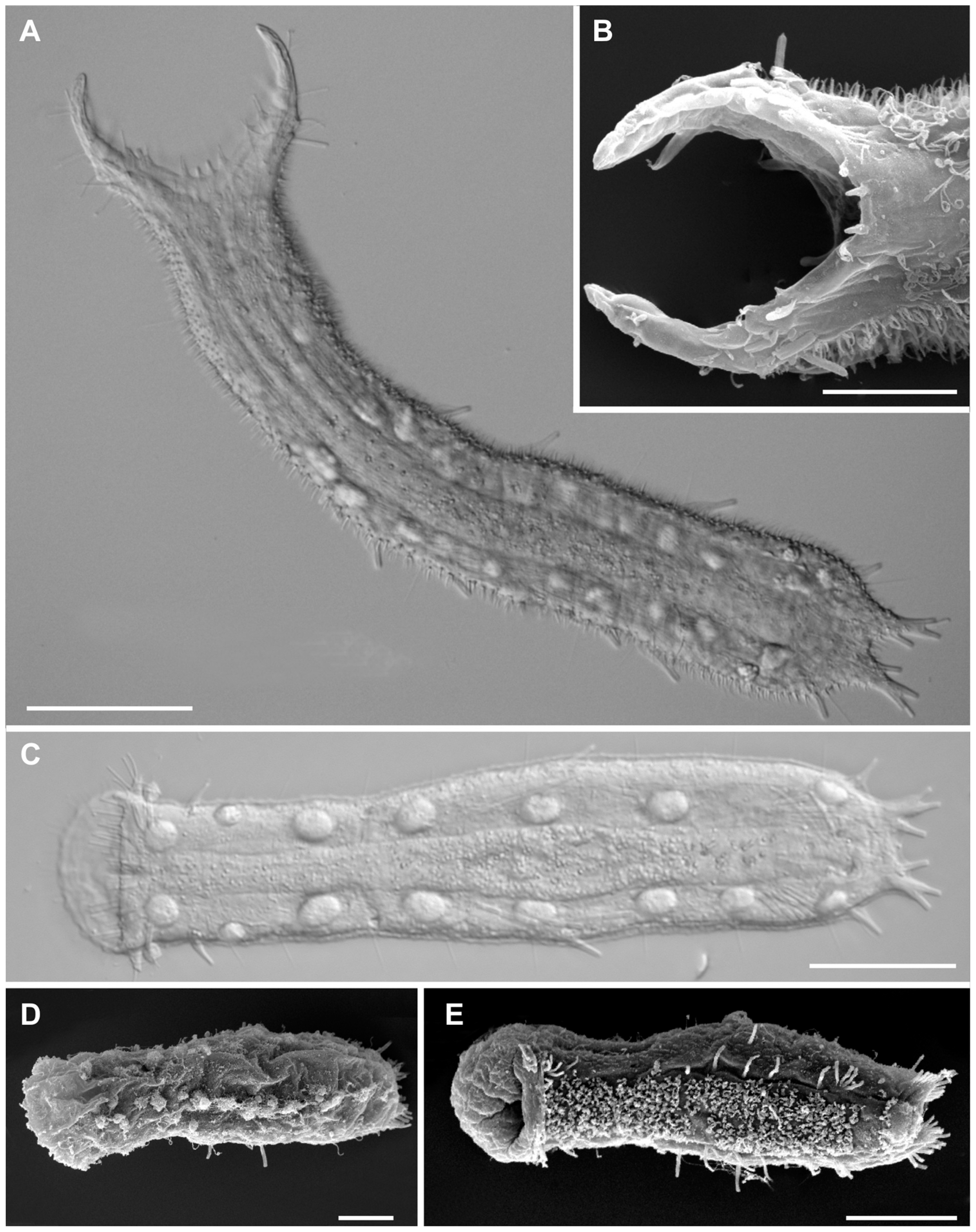
Ptychostomella sp., Macrodasyida

Gastrotrich reproduction and reproductive behaviour has been little studied. That of macrodasiyds probably most represents that of the ancestral lineage and these more primitive gastrotrichs are simultaneous hermaphrodites, possessing both male and female sex organs. There is generally a single pair of gonads, the anterior portion of which contains sperm-producing cells and the posterior portion producing ova. The sperm is sometimes packaged in spermatophores and is released through male gonopores that open, often temporarily, on the underside of the animal, roughly two-thirds of the way along the body. A copulatory organ on the tail collects the sperm and transfers it to the partner's seminal receptacle through the female gonopore. Details of the process and the behaviour involved vary with the species, and there is a range of different accessory reproductive organs. During copulation, the "male" individual uses his copulatory organ to transfer sperm to his partner's gonopore and fertilisation is internal. The fertilised eggs are released by rupture of the body wall which afterwards repairs itself. As is the case in most protostomes, development of the embryo is determinate, with each cell destined to become a specific part of the animal's body. At least one species of gastrotrich, Urodasys viviparus, is viviparous.

Many species of chaetotonid gastrotrichs reproduce entirely by parthenogenesis. In these species, the male portions of the reproductive system are degenerate and non-functional, or, in many cases, entirely absent. Though the eggs have a diameter of less than 50 μm, they are still very large in comparison with the animals' size. Some species are capable of laying eggs that remain dormant during times of desiccation or low temperatures; these species, however, are also able to produce regular eggs, which hatch in one to four days, when environmental conditions are more favourable. The eggs of all gastrotrichs undergo direct development and hatch into miniature versions of the adult. The young typically reach sexual maturity in about three days. In the laboratory, Lepidodermella squamatum has lived for up to forty days, producing four or five eggs during the first ten days of life.

Gastrotrichs demonstrate eutely, each species having an invariant genetically fixed number of cells as adults. Cell division ceases at the end of embryonic development and further growth is solely due to cell enlargement.

== Classification ==
Gastrotricha is divided into two orders and a number of families:

Order Macrodasyida Remane, 1925 [Rao and Clausen, 1970]

- Family Cephalodasyidae Hummon & Todaro, 2010

- Genus Cephalodasys Remane, 1926
- Genus Dolichodasys Gagne, 1977
- Genus Megadasys Schmidt, 1974
- Genus Mesodasys Remane, 1951
- Genus Paradasys Remane, 1934
- Genus Pleurodasys Remane, 1927

- Family Dactylopodolidae Strand, 1929

- Genus Dactylopodola Strand, 1929
- Genus Dendrodasys Wilke, 1954
- Genus Dendropodola Hummon, Todaro & Tongiorgi, 1992

- Family Lepidodasyidae Remane, 1927

- Genus Lepidodasys Remane, 1926

- Family Macrodasyidae Remane, 1926

- Genus Macrodasys Remane, 1924
- Genus Urodasys Remane, 1926

- Family Planodasyidae Rao & Clausen, 1970

- Genus Crasiella Clausen, 1968
- Genus Planodasys Rao & Clausen, 1970

- Family Redudasyidae Todaro, Dal Zotto, Jondelius, Hochberg et al., 2012

- Genus Anandrodasys Todaro, Dal Zotto, Jondelius, Hochberg et al., 2012
- Genus Redudasys Kisielewski, 1987

- Family Thaumastodermatidae Remane, 1927
  - Subfamily Diplodasyinae Ruppert, 1978
    - Genus Acanthodasys Remane, 1927
    - Genus Diplodasys Remane, 1927
  - Subfamily Thaumastodermatinae Remane, 1927
    - Genus Hemidasys Claparède, 1867
    - Genus Oregodasys Hummon, 2008 =(Platydasys Remane, 1927)
    - Genus Pseudostomella Swedmark, 1956
    - Genus Ptychostomella Remane, 1926
    - Genus Tetranchyroderma Remane, 1926
    - Genus Thaumastoderma Remane, 1926
- Family Turbanellidae Remane, 1927

- Genus Desmodasys Clausen, 1965
- Genus Dinodasys Remane, 1927
- Genus Paraturbanella Remane, 1927
- Genus Prostobuccantia Evans & Hummon, 1991
- Genus Pseudoturbanella d'Hondt, 1968
- Genus Turbanella Schultze, 1853

- Family Xenodasyidae Todaro, Guidi, Leasi & Tongiorgi, 2006

- Genus Chordodasiopsis Todaro, Guidi, Leasi & Tongiorgi, 2006
- Genus Xenodasys Swedmark, 1967

- Incertae sedis

- Genus Marinellina Ruttner-Kolisko, 1955

Order Chaetonotida Remane, 1925 [Rao and Clausen, 1970]

Suborder Multitubulatina d'Hondt, 1971

- Family Neodasyidae Remane, 1929

- Genus Neodasys Remane, 1927

Suborder Paucitubulatina d'Hondt, 1971

- Family Chaetonotidae Gosse, 1864
  - Subfamily Chaetonotinae Kisielewski, 1991
    - Genus Arenotus Kisielewski, 1987
    - Genus Aspidiophorus Voigt, 1903
    - Genus Caudichthydium Schwank, 1990
    - Genus Chaetonotus Ehrenberg, 1830
    - Genus Fluxiderma d'Hondt, 1974
    - Genus Ichthydium Ehrenberg, 1830
    - Genus Halichaetonotus Remane, 1936
    - Genus Heterolepidoderma Remane, 1927
    - Genus Lepidochaetus Kisielewski 1991
    - Genus Lepidodermella Blake, 1933
    - Genus Polymerurus Remane, 1927
    - Genus Rhomballichthys Schwank, 1990
  - Subfamily Undulinae Kisielewski 1991
    - Genus Undula Kisielewski 1991
- Family Dasydytidae Daday, 1905

- Genus Anacanthoderma Marcolongo, 1910
- Genus Chitonodytes Remane, 1936
- Genus Dasydytes Gosse, 1851
- Genus Haltidytes Remane 1936
- Genus Ornamentula Kisielewski 1991
- Genus Setopus Grünspan, 1908
- Genus Stylochaeta Hlava, 1905

- Family Dichaeturidae Remane, 1927

- Genus Dichaetura Lauterborn, 1913

- Family Muselliferidae Leasi & Todaro, 2008

- Genus Diuronotus Todaro, Kristensen & Balsamo, 2005
- Genus Musellifer Hummon, 1969

- Family Neogosseidae Remane, 1927

- Genus Neogossea Remane, 1927
- Genus Kijanebalola Beauchamp, 1932

- Family Proichthydiidae Remane, 1927

- Genus Proichthydium Cordero, 1918
- Genus Proichthydioides Sudzuki, 1971

- Family Xenotrichulidae Remane, 1927
  - Subfamily Draculiciterinae Ruppert, 1979
    - Genus Draculiciteria Hummon, 1974
  - Subfamily Xenotrichulinae Remane, 1927
    - Genus Heteroxenotrichula Wilke, 1954
    - Genus Xenotrichula Remane, 1927
