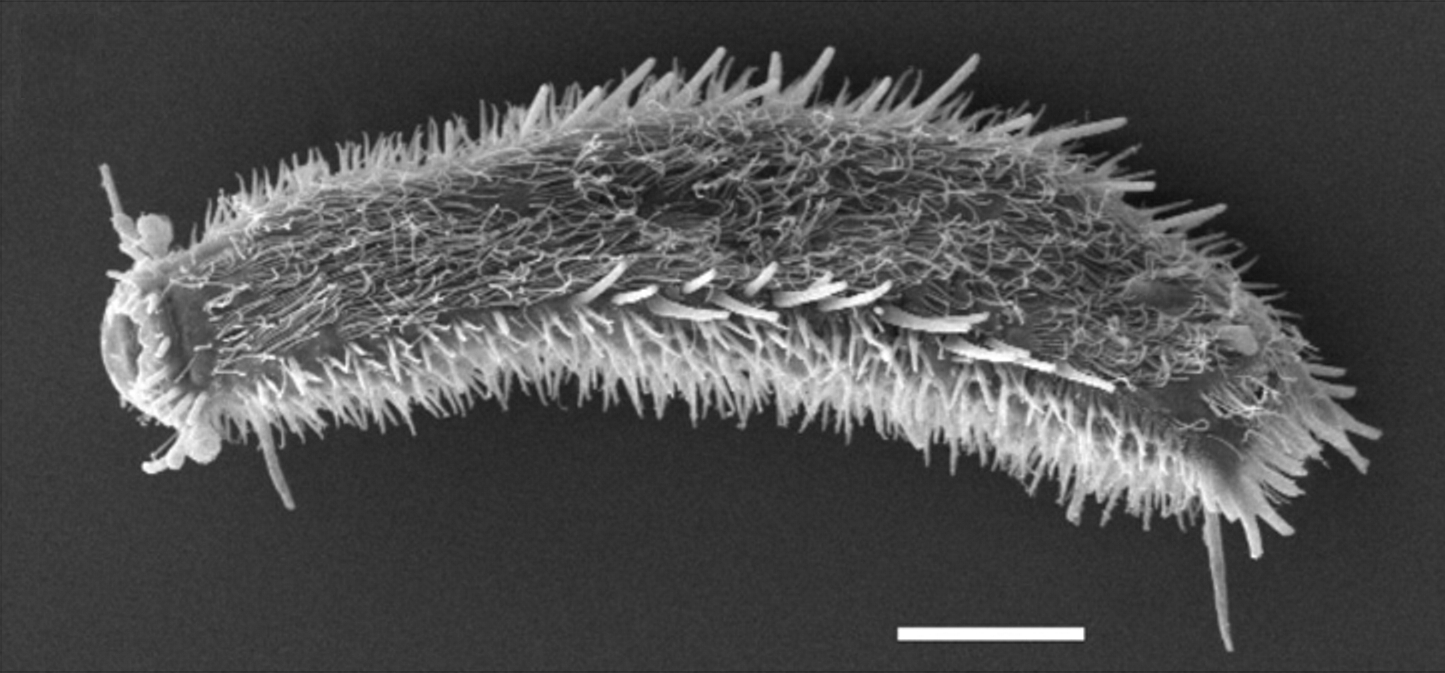
- Thaumastoderma ramuliferum (ventral view)

Scientific classification
- Kingdom: Animalia
- Phylum: Gastrotricha
- Order: Macrodasyida; Remane, 1925 [Rao & Clausen, 1970]

Families
- See text

= Macrodasyida =

Order of worm-like gastrotrichs

Macrodasyida is an order of gastrotrichs. Members of this order are somewhat worm-like in form, and not more than 1 to 1.5 mm in length.

Macrodasyids are almost in entirely marine and live in the sediment in marine or brackish water, but four species (Marinellina flagellata, Redudasys fornerise, R. neotemperatus, and R. brasiliensis) have been discovered in freshwater. They can be distinguished from other gastrotrichs by the presence of two pores on either side of the pharynx, that allow excess water to be expelled during feeding. The body is dorsally flattened and there are tubular adhesive glands at both ends and on the lateral surfaces. These animals are detritivores and are hermaphrodites.

== Families ==
- Cephalodasyidae Hummon & Todaro, 2010
- Dactylopodolidae Strand, 1929
- Hummondasyidae Todaro, Leasi & Hochberg, 2014
- Lepidodasyidae Remane, 1927
- Macrodasyidae Remane, 1924
- Mesodasyidae Cesaretti, Kosakyan, Saponi & Todaro, 2025
- Planodasyidae Rao & Clausen, 1970
- Redudasyidae Todaro, Dal Zotto, Jondelius, Hochberg, Hummon, Kanneby & Rocha, 2012
- Thaumastodermatidae Remane, 1927
- Turbanellidae Remane, 1926
- Urodasyidae Cesaretti, Kosakyan, Saponi & Todaro, 2025
- Xenodasyidae Todaro, Guidi, Leasi & Tongiorgi, 2006
