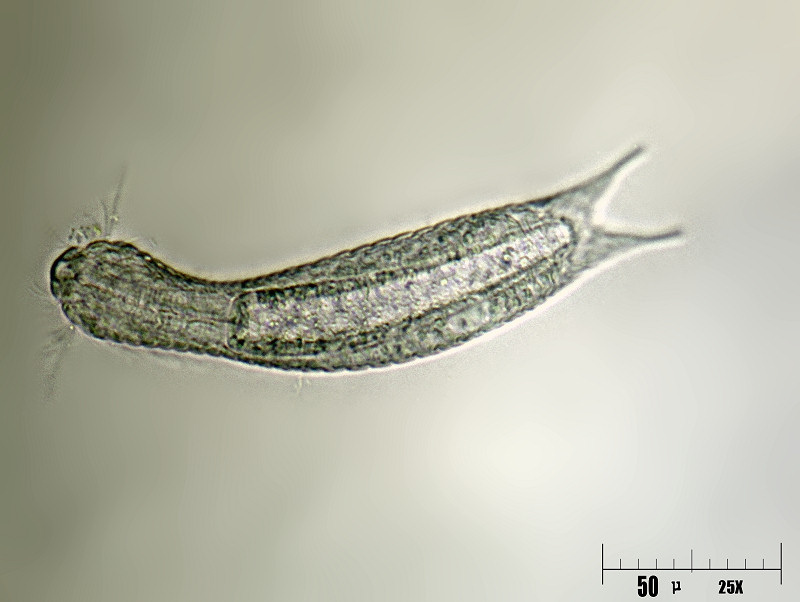
- Lepidodermella squamatum

Scientific classification
- Kingdom: Animalia
- Phylum: Gastrotricha
- Order: Chaetonotida; Remane, 1924

Suborders
- Multitubulatina; Paucitubulatina

= Chaetonotida =

Order of gastrotrichs

The Chaetonotida is an order of gastrotrichs. They generally have a tenpin or bottle-like shape.

Chaetonotids inhabit both freshwater and marine environments. They can be distinguished from other gastrotrichs by the absence of pores in the pharynx, and by the presence of adhesive glands at the posterior end of the animal only. Most freshwater species are parthenogenetic.

The smooth or complex cuticle has a variable number of adhesive tubes, and the pharyngeal lumen of Chaetonotids is Y-shaped. A valve may be present at the junction of the pharynx and midgut. The epidermis in most organisms in this order is partly syncytial. The Chaetonotids are divided into two suborders, Multitubulatina and Paucitubulatina. Multitubulatina are marine, hermaphroditic strap-shaped organisms. Paucitubulatina are mostly freshwater, bowling pin shaped organisms that can be hermaphroditic, parthenogenetic or both.
