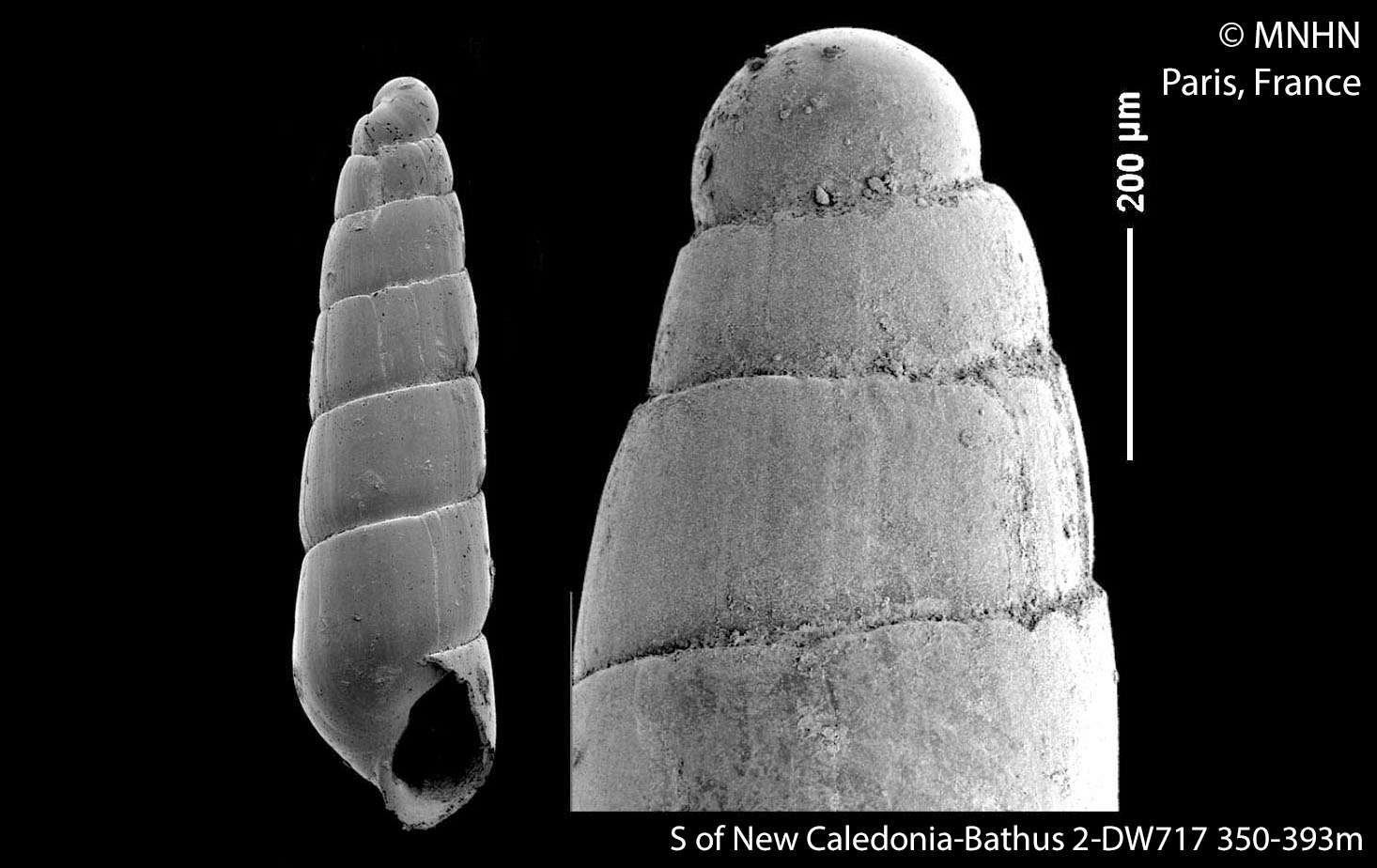
- Shell of Eulimella abdita (holotype at MNHN, Paris)

Scientific classification
- Kingdom: Animalia
- Phylum: Mollusca
- Class: Gastropoda
- Family: Pyramidellidae
- Subfamily: Turbonillinae
- Tribe: Eulimellini
- Genus: Eulimella; Forbes & Mac Andrew, 1846

Type species
- Eulima macandrei Forbes, 1844

Synonyms
- † Aciculina Deshayes, 1861 (invalid: junior homonym of Aciculina A. Adams, 1853); Anisocycla Monterosato, 1880; † Baudonia Bayan, 1873 (invalid: junior homonym of Baudonia Mabille, 1868 [Arionidae]; Belonidium is a replacement name); † Eulimella (Belonidium) Cossmann, 1892· accepted, alternate representation; Instarella Laseron, 1959; Odostomia (Anisocycla) Monterosato, 1880 (original rank as subgenus); Odostomia (Eulimella) Forbes & M'Andrew, 1846; Pyramidella (Eulimella) Forbes & M'Andrew, 1846; † Rhaphium Bayan, 1873 (invalid: junior homonym of Rhaphium Meigen, 1822 [Diptera]; Baudonia and Belonidium are replacement names)

= Eulimella =

Genus of gastropods

Eulimella is a genus of sea snails, marine gastropod mollusks in the family Pyramidellidae, the pyrams and their allies.

The subgenus name Ptycheulimella Sacco, 1892 or Turbonilla (Ptycheulimella) Sacco, 1892 has been used to describe species whose shells show a weak fold on the columella and frequently a brownish spiral band. Van Aartsen decided not to subdivide Eulimella s.l. because of the uncertainty of the identification of the type species of this subgenus compared with Tornatella pyramidata Deshayes, 183.

== Description ==
Many species are poorly known. The elongated, turriculate shells are small, mostly under 1 cm. They are somewhat glossy and show no sculpture except a few microscopic growth lines. The teleoconch has numerous whorls. The apex is sinistral. The aperture is subquadrangular. The outer lip is not continuous. The columella is straight, without plications. They lack a columellar tooth.

The animal has short tentacles. The mentum, a thin projection below the mouth, is lobed in front. The anterior extremity of the foot is truncated.

This family was described by Peñas A. & Rolán E. in 1997 and again in 2000. Van Aartsen et al. gave in 1988 a stable nomenclature of the genus

== Notes ==
Additional information regarding this genus:

- Authority: Authority of Octopus in Vaught, K.C. et al. (1989). A classification of the Living Mollusca. American Malacologists: Melbourne, FL (USA). XII, 195 pp.t is Jeffreys, 1847.For the authority we followed ITIS database

== Species ==
Species within the genus Eulimella include:

- Eulimella abdita Peñas & Rolán, 2016
- Eulimella accesa Peñas & Rolán, 2016
- Eulimella acicula (Philippi, 1836)
- Eulimella acusacuta Peñas & Rolán, 2016
- Eulimella acusangusta Peñas & Rolán, 1997
- Eulimella acutiformis Peñas & Rolán, 2016
- Eulimella aeaea Melvill, 1904
- Eulimella aequatorialis Thiele, 1925
- Eulimella alexandrinoi Peñas, Rolán & Swinnen, 2019
- † Eulimella alpha Laws, 1938
- Eulimella analogica Peñas & Rolán, 2016
- Eulimella angeli Peñas & Rolán, 1997
- Eulimella annulata Thiele, 1925
- Eulimella arabica Issel, 1869
- Eulimella arcta Peñas & Rolán, 2016
- Eulimella ataktos Warén, 1991
- Eulimella atlantis (Peñas & Rolán, 1999)
- Eulimella aureosuturalis Peñas & Rolán, 2016
- Eulimella aurifasciata Peñas & Rolán, 2016
- † Eulimella awamoaensis P. Marshall & Murdoch, 1921
- Eulimella bacillus Thiele, 1925
- † Eulimella beta Laws, 1938
- Eulimella bicolor Peñas & Rolán, 2016
- Eulimella bogii van Aartsen, 1995
- Eulimella boydae van Aartsen, Gittenberger & Goud, 2000
- Eulimella brevisutura Peñas & Rolán, 2016
- Eulimella carmanica Melvill, 1903
- Eulimella carminae (Peñas & Micali, 1999)
- Eulimella cerullii (Cossmann, 1916)
- Eulimella clarae Peñas & Rolán, 2016
- Eulimella clemam Peñas & Rolán, 2016
- Eulimella coena Webster, 1905
- Eulimella colorata Peñas & Rolán, 2016
- Eulimella columnella Thiele, 1925
- Eulimella comparabilis Peñas & Rolán, 2016
- Eulimella cossignaniorum van Aartsen, 1995
- † Eulimella coxi Laws, 1938
- Eulimella coysmani Peñas, Rolán & Swinnen, 2014
- Eulimella cultriformis Peñas & Rolán, 2016
- Eulimella cylindrata Pimenta, Santos & Absalão, 2011
- Eulimella cylindriformis Peñas & Rolán, 2016
- Eulimella cyrtoconoidea Peñas & Rolán, 2016
- Eulimella demissa Peñas & Rolán, 2016
- † Eulimella deplexa Hutton, 1885
- Eulimella depressa Peñas & Rolán, 2016
- † Eulimella dianeae Landau & LaFolette, 2015
- Eulimella digenes (Dautzenberg & Fischer, 1896)
- Eulimella discapex Peñas & Rolán, 2016
- Eulimella disciformis Peñas & Rolán, 2016
- Eulimella edentula Peñas & Rolán, 2016
- Eulimella egeria Melvill, 1912
- Eulimella ejuncida Pimenta, Santos & Absalão, 2011
- Eulimella erecta Thiele, 1925
- Eulimella eulimoides (Nomura, 1936)
- Eulimella excellens Peñas & Rolán, 2016
- Eulimella famelica Peñas & Rolán, 2016
- Eulimella finitima Peñas & Rolán, 2016
- Eulimella flavinfula Peñas & Rolán, 2016
- Eulimella flavocincta Peñas & Rolán, 2016
- Eulimella fontanae van Aartsen, Gittenberger & Goud, 2000
- Eulimella fractapex Peñas & Rolán, 2016
- Eulimella frielei Høisaeter, 2014
- Eulimella fulgens Thiele, 1925
- Eulimella funicula Peñas & Rolán, 2016
- Eulimella gabonensis Peñas, Rolán & Swinnen, 2014
- Eulimella gedrosica Melvill, 1904
- Eulimella giribeti Peñas & Rolán, 1997
- Eulimella gofasi (Schander, 1994)
- Eulimella grandis Peñas & Rolán, 2016
- Eulimella herosae van Aartsen, Gittenberger & Goud, 2000
- Eulimella hinomotoensis Nomura, 1938
- † Eulimella imitator Laws, 1939
- Eulimella inclinata Peñas & Rolán, 2016
- Eulimella infrafasciata Peñas & Rolán, 2016
- Eulimella inoperta Peñas & Rolán, 2016
- Eulimella interconvexa Peñas & Rolán, 2016
- Eulimella iusta Moreno, Peñas & Rolán, 2003
- Eulimella juliae Peñas & Rolán, 2002
- Eulimella kaasi (Aartsen, Gittenberger & Goud, 2000)
- † Eulimella kaawaensis Laws, 1940
- Eulimella kaisensis Melvill, 1898
- † Eulimella kempi Grant-Mackie & Chapman-Smith, 1971
- Eulimella kobelti (Dautzenberg, 1912)
- † Eulimella komitica Laws, 1939
- Eulimella lacrimaeformae Peñas & Rolán, 2016
- Eulimella lagoenaeformis Peñas & Rolán, 2016
- Eulimella lanceolata Peñas & Rolán, 2016
- † Eulimella lanotensis Lozouet, 1998
- † Eulimella larga Laws, 1938
- Eulimella levidensis Peñas & Rolán, 1997
- Eulimella levilirata Murdoch & Suter, 1906
- Eulimella limbata (Suter, 1907)
- Eulimella lissa A. E. Verrill, 1884
- Eulimella livida Peñas & Rolán, 2016
- Eulimella lomana (Dall, 1908)
- Eulimella longiuscula Peñas & Rolán, 2016
- Eulimella magna Peñas & Rolán, 2016
- Eulimella maia Melvill, 1910
- Eulimella marmorea Hori & Tsuchida, 1996
- Eulimella marquesensis Peñas & Rolán, 2016
- † Eulimella media (Hutton, 1885)
- Eulimella mersa Peñas & Rolán, 2016
- † Eulimella mestayerae (Marwick, 1931)
- Eulimella micra Peñas & Rolán, 2016
- Eulimella minima Peñas & Rolán, 2016
- Eulimella minisudis Peñas & Rolán, 2016
- Eulimella minisutura Peñas & Rolán, 2016
- Eulimella monicae Peñas, Rolán & Swinnen, 2019
- Eulimella nana Locard, 1897
- Eulimella neoattenuata (Gaglini, 1992)
- Eulimella niasensis Thiele, 1925
- Eulimella nona Peñas & Rolán, 2016
- Eulimella novacaledonica Peñas & Rolán, 2016
- Eulimella oliveri Peñas & Rolán, 2006
- Eulimella opaca A. Adams, 1861
- Eulimella opalina A. Adams, 1861
- Eulimella ortizae Peñas & Rolán, 2000
- Eulimella padangensis Thiele, 1925
- † Eulimella parlimbata Laws, 1939
- Eulimella parva Peñas & Rolán, 2016
- Eulimella parvacuta Peñas & Rolán, 2016
- Eulimella parvitas Peñas & Rolán, 2016
- Eulimella parvulissima Peñas & Rolán, 2016
- Eulimella paucispiralis Peñas & Rolán, 2016
- Eulimella paucisulcata Peñas & Rolán, 1997
- Eulimella pellucens A. Adams, 1861
- Eulimella penedesensis Moreno, Peñas & Rolán, 2003
- Eulimella perfiliformis Peñas & Rolán, 2016
- Eulimella pergracilis Peñas & Rolán, 2016
- Eulimella perinde Peñas & Rolán, 2016
- Eulimella perstriata Peñas & Rolán, 2016
- Eulimella perturbata Peñas, Rolán & Swinnen, 2014
- Eulimella phaula (Dautzenberg & Fischer H., 1896)
- Eulimella philippinensis Peñas & Rolán, 2016
- Eulimella pinna Peñas & Rolán, 2016
- Eulimella polita (A. E. Verrill, 1872) (invalid: junior homonym of Eulimella polita de Folin, 1870; no substitute name available)
- Eulimella polita de Folin, 1870
- Eulimella polygyrata Dautzenberg, 1912
- Eulimella porrecta Peñas & Rolán, 2016
- Eulimella postera Peñas & Rolán, 2016
- Eulimella praeclara Thiele, 1925
- Eulimella pressa Peñas & Rolán, 2016
- Eulimella primorum Peñas & Rolán, 2016
- Eulimella procera Peñas & Rolán, 2016
- Eulimella producta Peñas & Rolán, 2016
- Eulimella profunda Peñas & Rolán, 2016
- Eulimella propeacuta Peñas & Rolán, 2016
- Eulimella prosoclina Peñas & Rolán, 2016
- Eulimella protofunis (Peñas & Rolán, 1999)
- Eulimella proventa Peñas & Rolán, 2016
- Eulimella pseudoturbonilla Peñas & Rolán, 2016
- Eulimella punctistriata Peñas & Rolán, 2016
- Eulimella pyrgoidella Saurin, 1959
- Eulimella pyrgoides Dautzenberg & Fischer, 1906
- Eulimella quadrasi Boettger, 1893
- Eulimella repetitio Peñas & Rolán, 2016
- Eulimella robusta van Aartsen, Gittenberger E. & Goud, 1998
- Eulimella rudis Watson, 1886
- Eulimella rugata Peñas & Rolán, 2016
- Eulimella scalaris Peñas & Rolán, 2016
- Eulimella sceptrum Thiele, 1925
- Eulimella scillae (Scacchi, 1835)
- Eulimella scita Peñas & Rolán, 2016
- Eulimella semen Peñas & Rolán, 2016
- Eulimella shelaghae van Aartsen, Gittenberger & Goud, 2000
- Eulimella siamensis Robba, Di Geronimo, Chaimanee, Negri & Sanfilippo, 2004
- Eulimella siberutensis Thiele, 1925
- Eulimella sibogae Schepman, 1909
- Eulimella similebala Penas & Rolan, 1999
- Eulimella similminuta Peñas & Rolán, 1997
- Eulimella simplex (d'Orbigny, 1841)
- Eulimella sinuata van Aartsen, Gittenberger & Goud, 1998
- Eulimella smithii (A. E. Verrill, 1880)
- Eulimella solita Peñas, Rolán & Swinnen, 2014
- Eulimella solomonensis Peñas & Rolán, 2016
- Eulimella spicularis Peñas & Rolán, 2016
- Eulimella squarrosula Melvill, 1918
- Eulimella striatissima Peñas & Rolán, 2016
- Eulimella subcarina (Laseron, 1959)
- Eulimella subcurvata Peñas & Rolán, 2016
- Eulimella subincurvata Peñas & Rolán, 2016
- Eulimella subobtusa Peñas & Rolán, 2016
- Eulimella subscalaris Peñas & Rolán, 2016
- Eulimella sudis (Peñas & Rolán, 1999)
- Eulimella sumatrensis Thiele, 1925
- Eulimella syrnoloides Peñas & Rolán, 2016
- Eulimella talea Peñas, Rolán & Swinnen, 2014
- † Eulimella tampaensis Bartsch, 1955
- Eulimella tantula Peñas & Rolán, 2016
- Eulimella telum Schander, 1994
- Eulimella thalensis Robba, Di Geronimo, Chaimanee, Negri & Sanfilippo, 2004
- Eulimella torquata Pimenta, Santos & Absalão, 2011
- Eulimella toshikazui Hori & Fukuda, 1999
- Eulimella trewae van Aartsen, Gittenberger E. & Goud, 2000
- Eulimella troncosoi Peñas, Rolán & Swinnen, 2014
- Eulimella tydemani van Aartsen, Gittenberger & Goud, 1998
- Eulimella undata Peñas & Rolán, 2016
- Eulimella uniuspecei Peñas & Rolán, 2016
- Eulimella vanderlandi van Aartsen, Gittenberger & Goud, 2000
- Eulimella varia Peñas & Rolán, 2016
- Eulimella variabilis de Folin, 1870
- Eulimella vegrandis Peñas & Rolán, 2016
- Eulimella ventricosa (Forbes, 1844)
- Eulimella venusta Melvill, 1904
- Eulimella vitrea A. Adams, 1861
- Eulimella voluminis Peñas & Rolán, 2016
- † Eulimella waihoraensis (Marwick, 1931)
- Eulimella zornikulla Schander, 1994

According to a study published in November 2011 in Zootaxa, the following species do not belong in Eulimella:

- Eulimella argentina Doello-Jurado, 1938 : synonym of Turbonilla argentina (Doello-Jurado, 1938)
- Eulimella bahiensis Castellanos, 1982: synonym of Turbonilla bahiensis (Castellanos, 1982)

The following species were brought into synonymy:

- Eulimella aciculata Locard, 1886: synonym of Eulimella acicula (Philippi, 1836)
- Eulimella alba Calkins, 1878: synonym of Melanella conoidea (Kurtz & Stimpson, 1851)
- Eulimella amoebaea (Watson, 1886): synonym of Hamarilla amoebaea (R. B. Watson, 1886)
- Eulimella anabathron Hedley, 1906: synonym of Murchisonella anabathron (Hedley, 1906)
- Eulimella angusta Watson, 1886: synonym of Eulimostraca angusta (Watson, 1886)
- Eulimella argentina Doello-Jurado, 1938: synonym of Turbonilla argentina (Doello-Jurado, 1938)
- Eulimella bahiensis Castellanos, 1982: synonym of Turbonilla bahiensis (Castellanos, 1982)
- Eulimella buijsi van Aartsen, Gittenberger & Goud, 2000: synonym of Koloonella buijsi (van Aartsen, Gittenberger & Goud, 2000)
- Eulimella calva Schander, 1994: synonym of Koloonella calva (Schander, 1994)
- Eulimella carinata (Folin, 1870): synonym of Bacteridium carinatum (de Folin, 1870)
- Eulimella chariessa (Verrill, 1884): synonym of Melanella chariessa (A. E. Verrill, 1884)
- Eulimella chasteri Dautzenberg, 1912: synonym of Eulimella variabilis de Folin, 1870
- Eulimella cingulata Issel, 1869: synonym of Cingulina isseli (Tryon, 1886)
- Eulimella clavula Lovén, 1846: synonym of Liostomia clavula (Lovén, 1846)
- Eulimella coacta Watson, 1886: synonym of Koloonella coacta (Watson, 1886)
- Eulimella columna Hedley, 1907: synonym of Murchisonella columna (Hedley, 1907)
- Eulimella commutata Monterosato, 1884: synonym of Eulimella acicula (Philippi, 1836)
- Eulimella compactilis (Jeffreys, 1867): synonym of Eulimella acicula (Philippi, 1836)
- Eulimella compactilis Locard, 1892: synonym of Melanella compactilis (Locard, 1892)
- Eulimella cossignanii van Aartsen, 1995: synonym of Eulimella cossignaniorum van Aartsen, 1995
- Eulimella curtata Coen, 1933: synonym of Eulimella acicula (Philippi, 1836)
- Eulimella diaphana A. Adams, 1861: synonym of Ebalina diaphana (A. Adams, 1861)
- Eulimella eburnea Stimpson, 1851: synonym of Liostomia eburnea (Stimpson, 1851)
- Eulimella electa Jeffreys, 1883: synonym of Liostomia electa (Jeffreys, 1883)
- Eulimella endolamellata Schander, 1994: synonym of Syrnola endolamellata (Schander, 1994)
- Eulimella flagellum Coen, 1933: synonym of Eulimella acicula (Philippi, 1836)
- Eulimella folini P. Fischer in de Folin, 1869: synonym of Ebala striatula (Jeffreys, 1856)
- Eulimella gracilis Jeffreys, 1847: synonym of Eulimella ventricosa (Forbes, 1844)
- Eulimella hasta Laseron, 1951: synonym of Koloonella hasta (Laseron, 1951)
- Eulimella ignorabilis Peñas & Rolán, 1997: synonym of Koloonella ignorabilis (Peñas & Rolán, 1997)
- Eulimella inanis Dautzenberg, 1912: synonym of Eulimella kobelti (Dautzenberg, 1912)
- Eulimella inexpectata (Oliver, 1915): synonym of Raoulostraca inexpectata W. R. B. Oliver, 1915
- Eulimella laevis (Brown, 1827): synonym of Eulimella acicula (Philippi, 1836)
- Eulimella larochei Powell, 1930: synonym of Terelimella larochei (Powell, 1930)
- Eulimella laxa Watson, 1886: synonym of Koloonella laxa (Watson, 1886)
- Eulimella levissima de Folin, 1870: synonym of Cima minima (Jeffreys, 1858)
- Eulimella lucida Verrill, 1884: synonym of Melanella lucida (Verrill, 1884)
- Eulimella macandrei (Forbes, 1844): synonym of Eulimella scillae (Scacchi, 1835)
- Eulimella minor E. A. Smith, 1904: synonym of Pyramidella minor (E. A. Smith, 1904)
- Eulimella minuta (H. Adams, 1869): synonym of Syrnola minuta Adams H., 1869
- Eulimella minutissima Laseron, 1951: synonym of Koloonella minutissima (Laseron, 1951)
- Eulimella moniliforme Hedley & Musson, 1891: synonym of Koloonella moniliformis (Hedley & Musson, 1891)
- Eulimella moniliformis Hedley & Musson, 1891: synonym of Koloonella moniliformis (Hedley & Musson, 1891)
- Eulimella monolirata de Folin, 1874: synonym of Eulimella perturbata Peñas, Rolán & Swinnen, 2014
- Eulimella nitida Verrill, 1884: synonym of Halielloides nitidus (Verrill, 1884)
- Eulimella nitidissima : synonym of Ebala nitidissima (Montagu, 1803)
- Eulimella nivea E. A. Smith, 1904: synonym of Syrnola aganea (Bartsch, 1915)
- Eulimella nomurai Ozaki, 1958: synonym of Tachyrhynchus nomurai (Ozaki, 1958)
- Eulimella obeliscus Jeffreys, 1858: synonym of Eulimella ventricosa (Forbes, 1844)
- Eulimella occidentalis Hemphill, 1894: synonym of Murchisonella occidentalis (Hemphill, 1894)
- Eulimella parvula Thiele, 1925: synonym of Puposyrnola dorothea van Aartsen & Corgan, 1996
- Eulimella philippiana Dunker, 1860: synonym of Hypermastus philippiana (Dunker, 1860)
- Eulimella praelonga (Jeffreys, 1884): synonym of Eulimella cerullii (Cossmann, 1916)
- Eulimella schlumbergeri (Dautzenberg & Fischer, 1896): synonym of Turbonilla schlumbergeri Dautzenberg & H. Fischer, 1896
- Eulimella similiebala [sic] : synonym of Eulimella similebala Peñas & Rolán, 1999
- Eulimella striata de Folin, 1870: synonym of Ebala nitidissima (Montagu, 1803)
- Eulimella striata de Folin, 1870: synonym of Ebala pointeli (de Folin, 1868)
- Eulimella striatula Jeffreys, 1856: synonym of Ebala striatula (Jeffreys, 1856)
- Eulimella subcylindrica Dunker in Weinkauff, 1862: synonym of Eulimella acicula (Philippi, 1836)
- Eulimella subtilis Watson, 1886: synonym of Koloonella subtilis (Watson, 1886)
- Eulimella tenuis G.B. Sowerby III, 1894: synonym of Visma sowerbyi van Aartsen & Corgan, 1996
- Eulimella tenuis de Folin, 1870: synonym of Ebala pointeli (de Folin, 1868)
- Eulimella tomacula Laseron, 1951: synonym of Koloonella tomacula (Laseron, 1951)
- Eulimella trigonostoma de Folin, 1872: synonym of Ebala gradata (Monterosato, 1878)
- Eulimella turrita (Petterd, 1884): synonym of Koloonella turrita (Petterd, 1884)
- Eulimella turritellata (Requien, 1848): synonym of Eulimella gracilis Jeffreys, 1847
- Eulimella unifasciata (Forbes, 1844): synonym of Tibersyrnola unifasciata (Forbes, 1844)
- Eulimella vanhareni (van Aartsen, Gittenberger & Goud, 1998): synonym of Syrnola vanhareni (van Aartsen, Gittenberger & Goud, 1998)
- Eulimella venusta Melvill, 1904: synonym of Ebala venusta (Melvill, 1904)
- Eulimella verduini van Aartsen, Gittenberger & Goud, 1998: synonym of Eulimella neoattenuata (Gaglini, 1992)
- Eulimella xenophyes (Melvill & Standen, 1912): synonym of Atomiscala xenophyes (Melvill & Standen, 1912)

The following species are nomina dubia (names of unknown or doubtful application):

- Eulimella superflua (Monterosato, 1875) (nomen dubium)
- Eulimella turris (Forbes, 1844) (nomen dubium)
