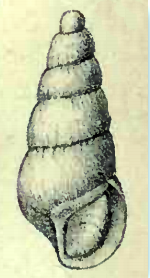
- Drawing of a shell of Eulimella ventricosa

Scientific classification
- Kingdom: Animalia
- Phylum: Mollusca
- Class: Gastropoda
- Family: Pyramidellidae
- Genus: Eulimella
- Species: E. ventricosa

Binomial name
- Eulimella ventricosa (Forbes, 1844)

Synonyms
- Cima ventricosa (Forbes, 1844); Eulima affinis Philippi, R.A., 1844; Eulimella gracilis Jeffreys, 1847; Eulimella obeliscus Jeffreys, 1858; Eulimella gracilis Jeffreys, J.G., 1869; Odostomia ventricosa (Forbes, 1844); Odostomia ventricosa var. minima Monterosato, 1880; Parthenia ventricosa Forbes, 1844; Pyramidella ventricosa (Forbes, 1844)

= Eulimella ventricosa =

Species of gastropod

Eulimella ventricosa is a species of sea snail, a marine gastropod mollusk in the family Pyramidellidae, the pyrams and their allies.

== Description ==
The shell is yellowish white with irregular light chestnut undulating longitudinal stripes, more or less intensified into revolving bands. The size of the shell varies between 1.9 mm and 6.2 mm. Compared to Eulimella acicula, the shell of Eulimella ventricosa is thinner, with tumid whorls and a deeper suture. The shell is slightly striated longitudinally, with the body whorl ventricose. The columella is triplicate.

== Distribution ==
This species occurs in the following locations at depths between 65 m and 480 m:

- Atlantic Europe
- Canary Islands
- Cape Verdes
- European waters (ERMS scope)
- Greek Exclusive Economic Zone: Aegean Sea
- Irish Exclusive economic Zone
- Madeira
- Northwest Atlantic Ocean (from Iceland to Norway)
- Portuguese Exclusive Economic Zone
- Spanish Exclusive Economic Zone
- United Kingdom Exclusive Economic Zone

== Notes ==
Additional information regarding this species:

- Taxonomic Remark: The name Pyramidella ventricosa or Eulimella ventricosa (type locality: eastern Mediterranean) has been misapplied to a western Atlantic species (for which, see Eulimella polita (A. E. Verrill, 1872)) and to an Indo-Pacific species, the identity of which is uncertain.
