= Syrnola endolamellata =

Scientific classification
- Kingdom: Animalia
- Phylum: Mollusca
- Class: Gastropoda
- Family: Pyramidellidae
- Genus: Syrnola
- Species: S. endolamellata

Binomial name
- Syrnola endolamellata (Schander, 1994)

Synonyms
- Eulimella endolamellata Schander, 1994

Species of gastropod

Syrnola endolamellata is a species of sea snail, a marine gastropod mollusk in the family Pyramidellidae, the pyrams and their allies.

== Description ==
The shell of this species can be easily recognized by its low whorls. Furthermore, in contrast to most Eulimella species, there are four or five teeth, forming a ridge, on the inner part of the outer lip. These teeth can also be found in the following species : Eulimella angeli Peñas & Rolán, 1997, Eulimella boydae van Aartsen, Gittenberger & Goud, 2000 and Eulimella vanhareni van Aartsen, Gittenberger & Goud, 1998.

== Distribution ==
This species occurs on the African side of the Atlantic Ocean, off Mauritania at depths between 30 m and 200 m.
