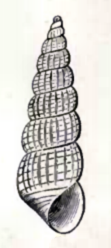
- Drawing of a shell of Turbonilla elegantula

Scientific classification
- Kingdom: Animalia
- Phylum: Mollusca
- Class: Gastropoda
- Family: Pyramidellidae
- Genus: Turbonilla
- Species: T. elegantula

Binomial name
- Turbonilla elegantula A. E. Verrill, 1882

Synonyms
- Besla elegans (d'Orbigny, 1841); Chemnitzia elegans d'Orbigny, 1841; Turbonilla elegans (d’Orbigny, 1841)

= Turbonilla elegantula =

Species of gastropod

Turbonilla elegantula is a species of sea snail, a marine gastropod mollusk in the family Pyramidellidae, the pyrams and their allies.

== Description ==
The length of the shell varies between 3 mm and 6 mm.

== Distribution ==
This marine species occurs in the following locations:

- Caribbean Sea
- Colombia
- Cuba
- Gulf of Mexico
- Mexico
- Northwest Atlantic : from Massachusetts to North Carolina.
- Puerto Rico

== Notes ==
Additional information regarding this species:

- Distribution: Range: 41.5°N to 35.3°N; 75.5°W to 70.7°W. Distribution: USA: Massachusetts, Connecticut, Virginia, North Carolina
