= E. commutata =

E. commutata may refer to:

- Echinochloa commutata, a wild grass
- Elaeagnus commutata, an ornamental plant
- Eulimella commutata, a sea snail
- Euphorbia commutata, a flowering plant
