= Odostomia disparilis =

Scientific classification
- Kingdom: Animalia
- Phylum: Mollusca
- Class: Gastropoda
- Family: Pyramidellidae
- Genus: Odostomia
- Species: O. disparilis

Binomial name
- Odostomia disparilis A. E. Verrill, 1884

Species of gastropod

Odostomia disparilis is a species of sea snail, a marine gastropod mollusc in the family Pyramidellidae, the pyrams and their allies.

== Description ==
The shell of this micromollusc grows to a length of 3.2 mm.

== Distribution ==
This species occurs in the following locations:

- Northwest Atlantic off North Carolina, USA

== Notes ==
Additional information regarding this species:

- Distribution: off Cape Hatteras, N.C.
- Feeding Type: parasitic > ectoparasitic
