= Odostomia bruneri =

Scientific classification
- Kingdom: Animalia
- Phylum: Mollusca
- Class: Gastropoda
- Family: Pyramidellidae
- Genus: Odostomia
- Species: O. bruneri

Binomial name
- Odostomia bruneri A. E. Verrill, 1882

Synonyms
- Menestho bruneri Verrill, 1882

Species of gastropod

Odostomia bruneri is a species of sea snail, a marine gastropod mollusc in the family Pyramidellidae, the pyrams and their allies.

== Description ==
The shell grows to a length of 5 mm.

== Distribution ==
This species occurs in the following locations:

- Northwest Atlantic Ocean

== Notes ==
Additional information regarding this species:

- Distribution: off Rhode Island
