= Odostomia alia =

Scientific classification
- Kingdom: Animalia
- Phylum: Mollusca
- Class: Gastropoda
- Family: Pyramidellidae
- Genus: Odostomia
- Species: O. alia

Binomial name
- Odostomia alia Peñas & Rolán, 1999

Species of gastropod

Odostomia alia is a species of sea snail, a marine gastropod mollusk in the family Pyramidellidae, the pyrams and their allies.

== Description ==
The white, shiny, slightly ovoid shell grows to a length of 1.6 mm. The teleoconch contains four smooth, turreted whorls. The body whorl measures two-thirds of the total length of the shell. The growth lines are leaning forward (adapically) with respect to the direction of the cone. Just like Eulimella polita, the aperture has a continuous peristome, but, in contrast, has no columellar fold. The outer lip lacks teeth.

== Distribution ==
This species occurs in the Atlantic Ocean from Mauritania to the Congo region at a depth of 36 m.
