= Turbonilla perlepida =

Scientific classification
- Kingdom: Animalia
- Phylum: Mollusca
- Class: Gastropoda
- Family: Pyramidellidae
- Genus: Turbonilla
- Species: T. perlepida

Binomial name
- Turbonilla perlepida A. E. Verrill, 1885

Species of gastropod

Turbonilla perlepida is a species of sea snail, a marine gastropod mollusk in the family Pyramidellidae, the pyrams and their allies.

== Distribution ==
This species occurs in the following locations:

- North West Atlantic

== Notes ==
Additional information regarding this species:

- Distribution: off Chesapeake Bay
