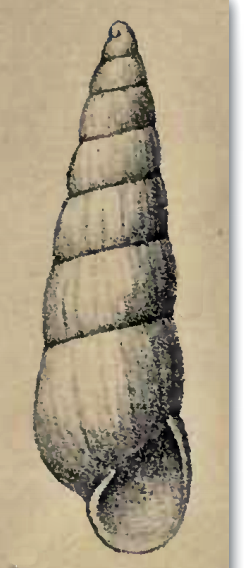
- Drawing of a shell of Eulimella lissa

Scientific classification
- Kingdom: Animalia
- Phylum: Mollusca
- Class: Gastropoda
- Family: Pyramidellidae
- Genus: Eulimella
- Species: E. lissa

Binomial name
- Eulimella lissa A. E. Verrill, 1884

Synonyms
- Pyramidella lissa (A. E. Verrill, 1884)

= Eulimella lissa =

Species of gastropod

Eulimella lissa is a species of sea snail, a marine gastropod mollusk in the family Pyramidellidae, the pyrams and their allies.

== Description ==
The white shell is small with a length of 6mm. It has a pupiform shape. The teleoconch contains eight flattened whorls. The sculpture is smooth and polished. The suture is distinct.

== Distribution ==
This species occurs in the following locations:

- North West Atlantic
- Cape Hatteras, North Carolina, USA
