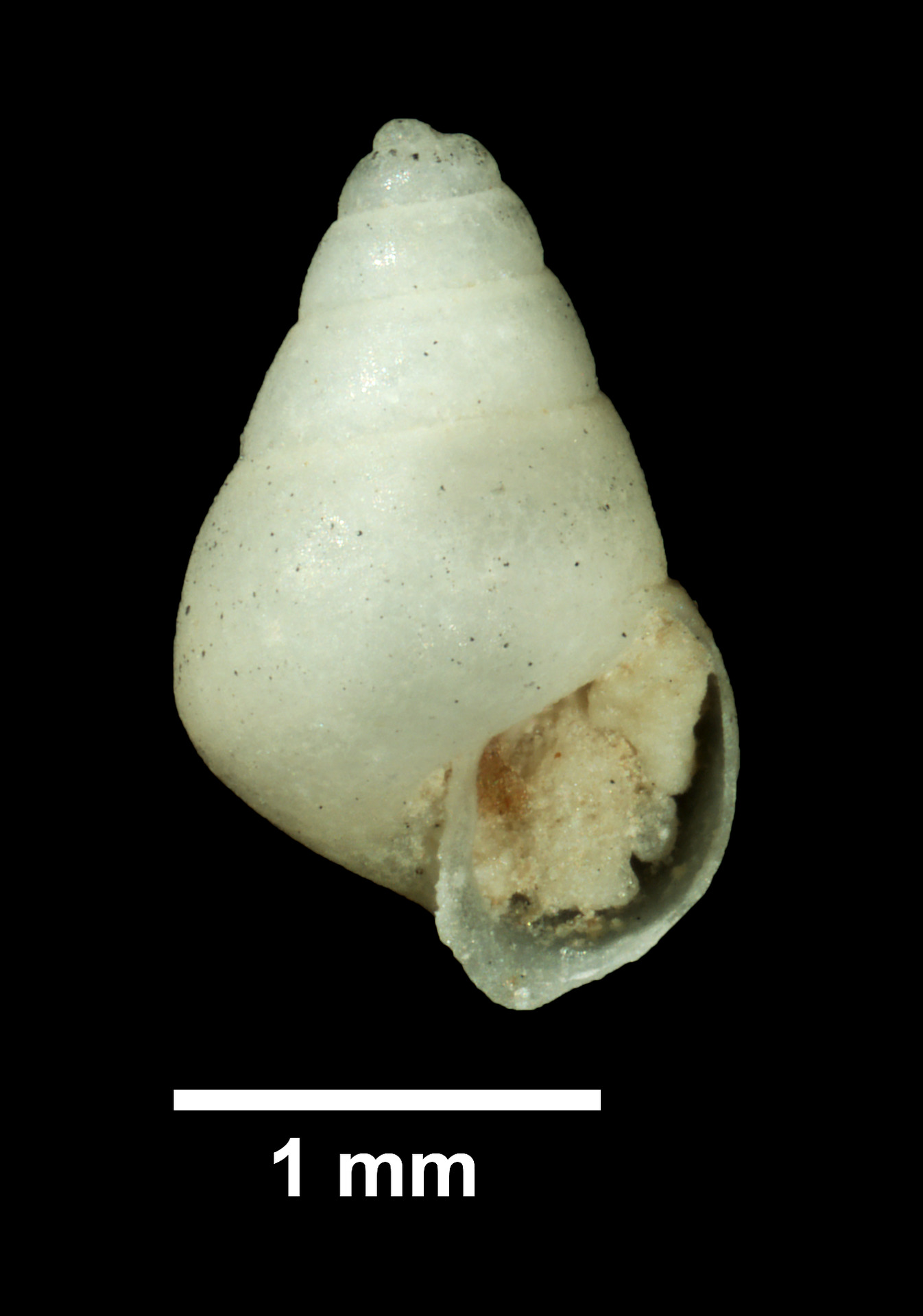

Scientific classification
- Kingdom: Animalia
- Phylum: Mollusca
- Class: Gastropoda
- Family: Pyramidellidae
- Genus: Odostomia
- Species: O. lubrica

Binomial name
- Odostomia lubrica Verrill & Bush, 1900

= Odostomia lubrica =

Species of gastropod

Odostomia lubrica is a species of sea snail, a marine gastropod mollusc in the family Pyramidellidae, the pyrams and their allies.

== Description ==
The shell grows to a length of 2.2 mm.

== Distribution ==
This species occurs in the Atlantic Ocean off the Bermudas.
