= Turbonilla grandis =

Scientific classification
- Kingdom: Animalia
- Phylum: Mollusca
- Class: Gastropoda
- Family: Pyramidellidae
- Genus: Turbonilla
- Species: T. grandis

Binomial name
- Turbonilla grandis A. E. Verrill, 1885

Synonyms
- Pyrgiscus grandis (A. E. Verrill, 1885)

Species of gastropod

Turbonilla grandis is a species of sea snail, a marine gastropod mollusk in the family Pyramidellidae, the pyrams and their allies.

== Description ==
The shell grows to a length of 18 mm.

== Distribution ==
This species occurs in the following locations:

- Northwest Atlantic, off Virginia, USA at a depth of 2893 m.

== Notes ==
Additional information regarding this species:

- Distribution: Range: 37.42°N; 73.2°W. Distribution: USA: Virginia
