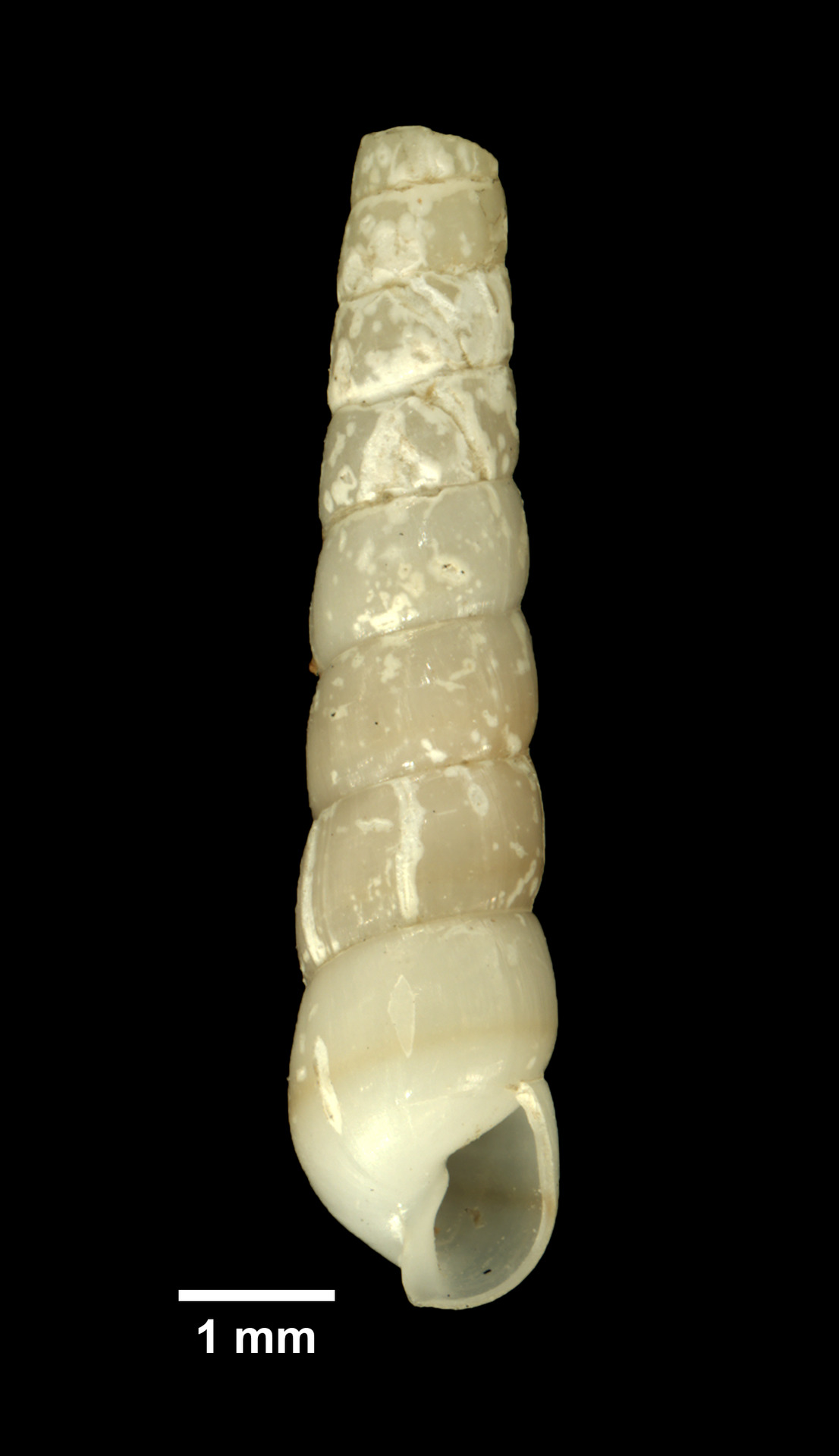

Scientific classification
- Kingdom: Animalia
- Phylum: Mollusca
- Class: Gastropoda
- Family: Pyramidellidae
- Genus: Eulimella
- Species: E. smithii

Binomial name
- Eulimella smithii (A. E. Verrill, 1880)

= Eulimella smithii =

Species of gastropod

Eulimella smithii is a species of sea snail, a marine gastropod mollusk in the family Pyramidellidae, the pyrams and their allies.

== Distribution ==
This species occurs in the following locations:

- North West Atlantic

== Notes ==
Additional information regarding this species:

- Distribution: Range: 40.05°N to 13°N; 82°W to 59.6°W. Distribution: USA: Massachusetts, Florida; Florida: West Florida; Barbados
