= Turbonilla argentina =

Scientific classification
- Kingdom: Animalia
- Phylum: Mollusca
- Class: Gastropoda
- Family: Pyramidellidae
- Genus: Turbonilla
- Species: T. argentina

Binomial name
- Turbonilla argentina (Doello-Jurado, 1938)

Synonyms
- Eulimella argentina Doello-Jurado, 1938 (basionym)

Species of gastropod

Turbonilla argentina is a species of sea snail, a marine gastropod mollusk in the family Pyramidellidae, the pyramids and their allies.

It was formerly placed in the genus in Eulimella, but a study published in November 2011 in Zootaxa, concluded that it did not belong there.

== Description ==
The shell grows to a length of 5.5 mm.

== Distribution ==
This species occurs in the Atlantic Ocean off Uruguay and Argentina.
