= Eulimella bogii =

Scientific classification
- Kingdom: Animalia
- Phylum: Mollusca
- Class: Gastropoda
- Family: Pyramidellidae
- Genus: Eulimella
- Species: E. bogii

Binomial name
- Eulimella bogii van Aartsen, 1995

Species of gastropod

Eulimella bogii is a species of sea snail, a marine gastropod mollusk in the family Pyramidellidae, the pyrams and their allies.

== Description ==
The shell grows to a length of 3.2 mm and a width of 2.4 mm.

== Distribution ==
This species occurs in the following locations: at depths between 100 m and 550 m

- European waters (ERMS scope) : Mediterranean Sea
- Portuguese Exclusive Economic Zone : Madeira
- Spanish Exclusive Economic Zone : Canary Islands
