= Eulimostraca burragei =

- Shell of Eulimostraca burragei

Scientific classification
- Kingdom: Animalia
- Phylum: Mollusca
- Class: Gastropoda
- Subclass: Caenogastropoda
- Order: Littorinimorpha
- Family: Eulimidae
- Genus: Eulimostraca
- Species: E. burragei

Binomial name
- Eulimostraca burragei Bartsch, 1917

Synonyms
- Eulimostraca panamensis Bartsch, 1917; Melanella (Melanella) panamensis Bartsch, 1917 alternative representation; Melanella panamensis Bartsch, 1917; Strombiformis burragei Bartsch, 1917

Species of gastropod

Eulimostraca burragei is a species of sea snail, a marine gastropod mollusk in the family Eulimidae.

== Description ==
The length of the shell (without the lost first whorl) attains 2.8 mm, its diameter 1 mm.

(Described as Eulimostraca panamensis) The shell is small and elongate-conic. It is yellowish-white, polished, and marked by exceedingly fine lines of growth only. There are nine remaining whorls in the holotype. The first three whorls are well rounded and separated by a well-impressed suture, while the succeeding whorls are flattened with a poorly defined suture. The periphery of the body whorl is decidedly angulated. The base is short and well rounded.

The aperture is small and broadly oval with an acute posterior angle. The outer lip is angulated at the junction with the basal lip. The inner lip is very oblique, stout, slightly curved, and reflected over and appressed to the base posteriorly. The parietal wall is covered with a thick callus.

== Distribution ==
This species occurs in the Pacific Ocean off the USA, Mexico, Panama and Ecuador.
