= Halielloides fragilis =

Scientific classification
- Kingdom: Animalia
- Phylum: Mollusca
- Class: Gastropoda
- Subclass: Caenogastropoda
- Order: Littorinimorpha
- Family: Eulimidae
- Genus: Halielloides
- Species: H. fragilis

Binomial name
- Halielloides fragilis Bouchet & Warén, 1986

Species of gastropod

Halielloides fragilis is a species of sea snail, a marine gastropod mollusk of the family Eulimidae. This species, along with Halielloides nitidus and Halielloides verrilliana, belongs in the genus Halielloides.

== Distribution ==
This species occurs in the following locations:

- European waters (ERMS scope)
- United Kingdom Exclusive Economic Zone
