= Eulimella kobelti =

Scientific classification
- Kingdom: Animalia
- Phylum: Mollusca
- Class: Gastropoda
- Family: Pyramidellidae
- Genus: Eulimella
- Species: E. kobelti

Binomial name
- Eulimella kobelti (Dautzenberg, 1912)

Synonyms
- Eulimella inanis Dautzenberg, 1912; Turbonilla kobelti Dautzenberg, 1912

Species of gastropod

Eulimella kobelti is a species of sea snail, a marine gastropod mollusk in the family Pyramidellidae, the pyrams and their allies.
