= Eulimella pellucens =

Eulimella pelluscens

Scientific classification
- Kingdom: Animalia
- Phylum: Mollusca
- Class: Gastropoda
- Family: Pyramidellidae
- Genus: Eulimella
- Species: E. pelluscens

Binomial name
- Eulimella pelluscens A. Adams, 1861

Synonyms
- Eulima pelluscens [sic] (misspelling)

Species of gastropod

Eulimella pelluscens is a species of sea snail, a marine gastropod mollusk in the family Eulimidae. The species is one of a number within the genus Eulimella.
