= Eulimella cossignaniorum =

Scientific classification
- Kingdom: Animalia
- Phylum: Mollusca
- Class: Gastropoda
- Family: Pyramidellidae
- Genus: Eulimella
- Species: E. cossignaniorum

Binomial name
- Eulimella cossignaniorum van Aartsen, 1995

Synonyms
- Eulimella cossignanii van Aartsen, 1995

Species of gastropod

Eulimella cossignaniorum is a species of sea snail, a marine gastropod mollusk in the family Pyramidellidae.

== Distribution ==
This species occurs in the following locations:

- European waters
