= Eulimella rudis =

Scientific classification
- Kingdom: Animalia
- Phylum: Mollusca
- Class: Gastropoda
- Family: Pyramidellidae
- Genus: Eulimella
- Species: E. rudis

Binomial name
- Eulimella rudis Watson, 1886

Species of gastropod

Eulimella rudis is a species of sea snail, a marine gastropod mollusk in the family Pyramidellidae, the pyrams and their allies.

== Description ==
The shell grows to a length of 4.8 mm.

== Distribution ==
This species occurs in the Atlantic Ocean from Brazil to Argentina.
