= Eulimella kaisensis =

Scientific classification
- Kingdom: Animalia
- Phylum: Mollusca
- Class: Gastropoda
- Family: Pyramidellidae
- Genus: Eulimella
- Species: E. kaisensis

Binomial name
- Eulimella kaisensis Melvill, 1898

Species of gastropod

Eulimella kaisensis is a species of sea snail, a marine gastropod mollusk in the family Pyramidellidae, the pyrams and their allies.
