= Eulimella paucisulcata =

Scientific classification
- Kingdom: Animalia
- Phylum: Mollusca
- Class: Gastropoda
- Family: Pyramidellidae
- Genus: Eulimella
- Species: E. paucisulcata

Binomial name
- Eulimella paucisulcata Peñas & Rolán, 1997

Species of gastropod

Eulimella paucisulcata is a species of sea snail, a marine gastropod mollusk in the family Pyramidellidae, the pyrams and their allies.

== Description ==
The helicocone shell can be distinguished from the shell of Eulimella angeli by a clear protoconch - teleoconch boundary. Furthermore, the growth lines are straight and orthocline (at right angles to the growth direction of the helicocone).

== Distribution ==
This species occurs in the Atlantic Ocean off Mauritania and Ghana at a depth of 0 m.
