= Eulimella penedesensis =

Scientific classification
- Kingdom: Animalia
- Phylum: Mollusca
- Class: Gastropoda
- Family: Pyramidellidae
- Genus: Eulimella
- Species: E. penedesensis

Binomial name
- Eulimella penedesensis Moreno, Peñas & Rolán, 2003

Species of gastropod

Eulimella penedesensis is a species of sea snail, a marine gastropod mollusk in the family Pyramidellidae, the pyrams and their allies.
