= Eulimella toshikazui =

Scientific classification
- Kingdom: Animalia
- Phylum: Mollusca
- Class: Gastropoda
- Family: Pyramidellidae
- Genus: Eulimella
- Species: E. toshikazui

Binomial name
- Eulimella toshikazui Hori & Fukuda, 1999

Species of gastropod

Eulimella toshikazui is a species of sea snail, a marine gastropod mollusk in the family of Pyramidellidae, the pyrams and their allies.
