= Eulimella fontanae =

Scientific classification
- Kingdom: Animalia
- Phylum: Mollusca
- Class: Gastropoda
- Family: Pyramidellidae
- Genus: Eulimella
- Species: E. fontanae

Binomial name
- Eulimella fontanae van Aartsen, Gittenberger & Goud, 2000

Species of gastropod

Eulimella fontanae is a species of sea snail, a marine gastropod mollusk in the family Pyramidellidae, the pyrams and their allies.

The epithet "fontanae" refers to Mrs M.A. Fontana Angioy, editor of the journal La Conchiglia.

== Description ==
This species is similar to Eulimella cerullii (Cossmann, 1916). The size of the slender, conical shell varies between 3.5 mm and 4.3 mm. The teleoconch contains six to seven rather flat whorls with a deep suture between them. The growth lines, shaped like an inverted S, are at about right angles to the growth direction. The aperture is oval. The shell lacks an umbilicus and has a noticeable fold on the columella.

== Distribution ==
The species occurs in the Atlantic Ocean off the Azores at depths between 400 m and 620 m.
