= Eulimostraca armonica =

Scientific classification
- Kingdom: Animalia
- Phylum: Mollusca
- Class: Gastropoda
- Subclass: Caenogastropoda
- Order: Littorinimorpha
- Family: Eulimidae
- Genus: Eulimostraca
- Species: E. armonica

Binomial name
- Eulimostraca armonica Espinosa & Ortea, 2007

Species of gastropod

Eulimostraca armonica is a species of sea snail, a marine gastropod mollusk in the family Eulimidae.
