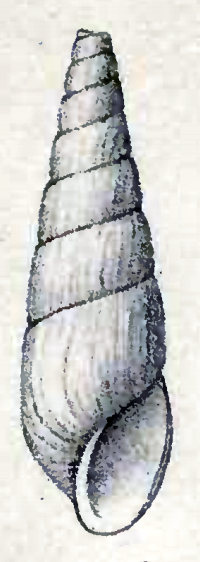
- Halielloides nitidus

Scientific classification
- Kingdom: Animalia
- Phylum: Mollusca
- Class: Gastropoda
- Subclass: Caenogastropoda
- Order: Littorinimorpha
- Family: Eulimidae
- Genus: Halielloides; Bouchet & Warén, 1986

Type species
- Halielloides ingolfianus Bouchet & Warén, 1986

= Halielloides =

Genus of gastropods

Halielloides is a genus of sea snails, marine gastropod mollusks in the family Eulimidae.

== Species ==
Species within this genus include the following:

- Halielloides fragilis (Bouchet & Warén, 1986)
- Halielloides hyalina (R. B. Watson, 1883)
- Halielloides ingolfiana Bouchet & Warén, 1986
- Halielloides verrilliana (Bush, 1909)

Species brought into synonymy

- Halielloides ingolfiana (Bouchet & Warén, 1986): synonym of Halielloides nitidus (Verrill, 1884)
- Halielloides ingolfianus Bouchet & Warén, 1986: synonym of Halielloides nitidus (Verrill, 1884)
- Halielloides nitidus (Verrill, 1884): synonym of Halielloides verrilliana (Bush, 1909)
