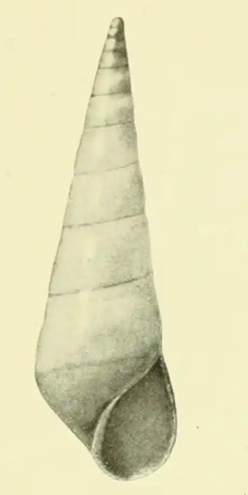
- Shell of Eulimostraca galapagensis (original image)

Scientific classification
- Kingdom: Animalia
- Phylum: Mollusca
- Class: Gastropoda
- Subclass: Caenogastropoda
- Order: Littorinimorpha
- Family: Eulimidae
- Genus: Eulimostraca
- Species: E. galapagensis

Binomial name
- Eulimostraca galapagensis Bartsch, 1917

= Eulimostraca galapagensis =

Species of gastropod

Eulimostraca galapagensis is a species of sea snail, a marine gastropod mollusk in the family Eulimidae.

== Description ==
The length of the shell attains 3.8 mm, its diameter 1.2 mm.

(Original description) The shell is broadly elongate-conic and thin. It is translucent, showing the internal structure through the substance of the shell. The whorls are rather high between the sutures, moderately well rounded, and appressed at the summit. They are polished and marked only by exceedingly fine incremental lines. The suture is lightly impressed. The periphery of the body whorl is somewhat inflated and strongly angulated, and it is marked by a narrow brownish band. The base is short and well rounded.

The aperture is very broadly oval, with its posterior angle acute. The outer lip is thin and tinged with brown on the posterior half; it is decidedly protracted in the middle so as to form a claw-like element. The inner lip is strongly curved and slightly reflected, fusing only slightly, posteriorly, with the preceding whorl. The parietal wall is covered by a thin callus.

== Distribution ==
This marine species occurs off the Galapagos Islands.
