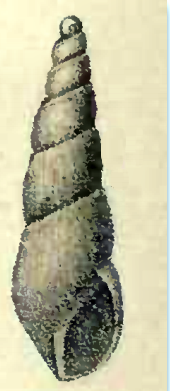
- Drawing of a shell of Eulimella simplex

Scientific classification
- Kingdom: Animalia
- Phylum: Mollusca
- Class: Gastropoda
- Family: Pyramidellidae
- Genus: Eulimella
- Species: E. simplex

Binomial name
- Eulimella simplex (d'Orbigny, 1841)

= Eulimella simplex =

Species of gastropod

Eulimella simplex is a species of sea snail, a marine gastropod mollusk in the family Pyramidellidae, the pyrams and their allies.

== Description ==
The white shell is thin. Its length measures 2.3 mm. Its sculpture shows finely spiral striae. The seven whorls of the teleoconch are slightly convex, with a shallow channel next above the suture.

== Distribution ==
This species occurs in the Caribbean Sea off Jamaica.
