= Eulimella phaula =

Scientific classification
- Kingdom: Animalia
- Phylum: Mollusca
- Class: Gastropoda
- Family: Pyramidellidae
- Genus: Eulimella
- Species: E. phaula

Binomial name
- Eulimella phaula (Dautzenberg & Fischer H., 1896)

Species of gastropod

Eulimella phaula is a species of sea snail, a marine gastropod mollusk in the family Pyramidellidae, the pyrams and their allies.

== Distribution ==
This species occurs in the following locations:

- European waters (ERMS scope)

== Notes ==
Additional information regarding this species:

- Habitat: Known from seamounts and knolls
