= Eulimella sinuata =

Scientific classification
- Kingdom: Animalia
- Phylum: Mollusca
- Class: Gastropoda
- Family: Pyramidellidae
- Genus: Eulimella
- Species: E. sinuata

Binomial name
- Eulimella sinuata van Aartsen, Gittenberger & Goud, 1998

Species of gastropod

Eulimella sinuata is a species of sea snail, a marine gastropod mollusk in the family Pyramidellidae, the pyrams and their allies.

== Description ==
The shell has the shape of a very slender, elongated cone. Its length measures between 3.3 mm and 4.5 mm. Its colour is whitish, sometimes with a very faint yellowish-brown, spiral band around the periphery. The whorls of the protoconch are somewhat spirally coiled. The six to seven nearly flat whorls of the teleoconch are slightly angled at the periphery. The suture is very clearly marked. The growth lines are leaning forward with respect to the direction of the cone. The surface of the shell is smooth lacking further sculpture. The outer lip is straight adapically, turning into a gentle curve below. The umbilicus is lacking. As with the species in this genus, there is no columellar tooth but only an indistinct fold.

== Distribution ==
This species occurs in the following locations:

- Cape Verde at depths between 225m and 930 m.
