= Eulimella gofasi =

Scientific classification
- Kingdom: Animalia
- Phylum: Mollusca
- Class: Gastropoda
- Family: Pyramidellidae
- Genus: Eulimella
- Species: E. gofasi

Binomial name
- Eulimella gofasi (Schander, 1994)

Synonyms
- Bacteridiella gofasi Schander, 1994 (basionym); Eulimella monolirata Peñas & Rolán, 1997 (not Eulimella monolirata de Folin, 1874)

Species of gastropod

Eulimella gofasi is a species of sea snail, a marine gastropod mollusk in the family Pyramidellidae, the pyrams and their allies.

== Description ==
The size of the shell varies between 2 mm and 3 mm. Each whorl contains four of five incisions.

== Distribution ==
This species occurs in the Atlantic Ocean off West Africa (Mauritania, Guinea) at depths between 20 m and 152 m
