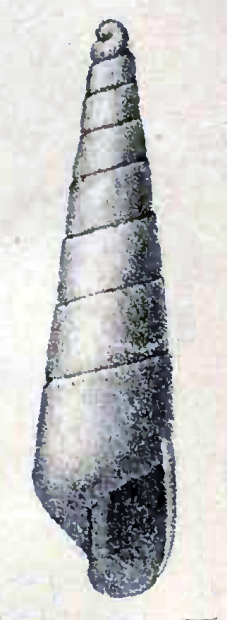
- Drawing of a shell of Eulimella cerullii

Scientific classification
- Kingdom: Animalia
- Phylum: Mollusca
- Class: Gastropoda
- Family: Pyramidellidae
- Genus: Eulimella
- Species: E. cerullii

Binomial name
- Eulimella cerullii (Cossmann, 1916)

Synonyms
- Eulimella praelonga (Jeffreys, 1884); Odostomia praelonga Jeffreys, 1884 (not Odostomia praelonga Deshayes, 1861); Syrnola cerullii Cossmann, 1916

= Eulimella cerullii =

Species of gastropod

Eulimella cerullii is a species of sea snail, a marine gastropod mollusk in the family Pyramidellidae, the pyrams and their allies.

== Description ==
The size of the shell varies between 3.5 mm and 7 mm. The thin, semitransparent, white shell is very glossy. The teleoconch contains ten whorls that are flattened and with a slight suture. The columella has a small, tooth-like thickening.

== Distribution ==
This species occurs in the following locations:

- European waters (ERMS scope)
- Greek Exclusive Economic Zone
- Portuguese Exclusive Economic Zone : Madeira (at a depth of 1100 m)
- Spanish Exclusive Economic Zone
