= Eulimostraca encalada =

Scientific classification
- Kingdom: Animalia
- Phylum: Mollusca
- Class: Gastropoda
- Subclass: Caenogastropoda
- Order: Littorinimorpha
- Family: Eulimidae
- Genus: Eulimostraca
- Species: E. enclada

Binomial name
- Eulimostraca enclada Espinosa, Ortea & Magaña, 2006

Species of gastropod

Eulimostraca encalada is a species of sea snail, a marine gastropod mollusk in the family Eulimidae.

== Distribution ==
This species occurs in the following locations:

- Gulf of Mexico
