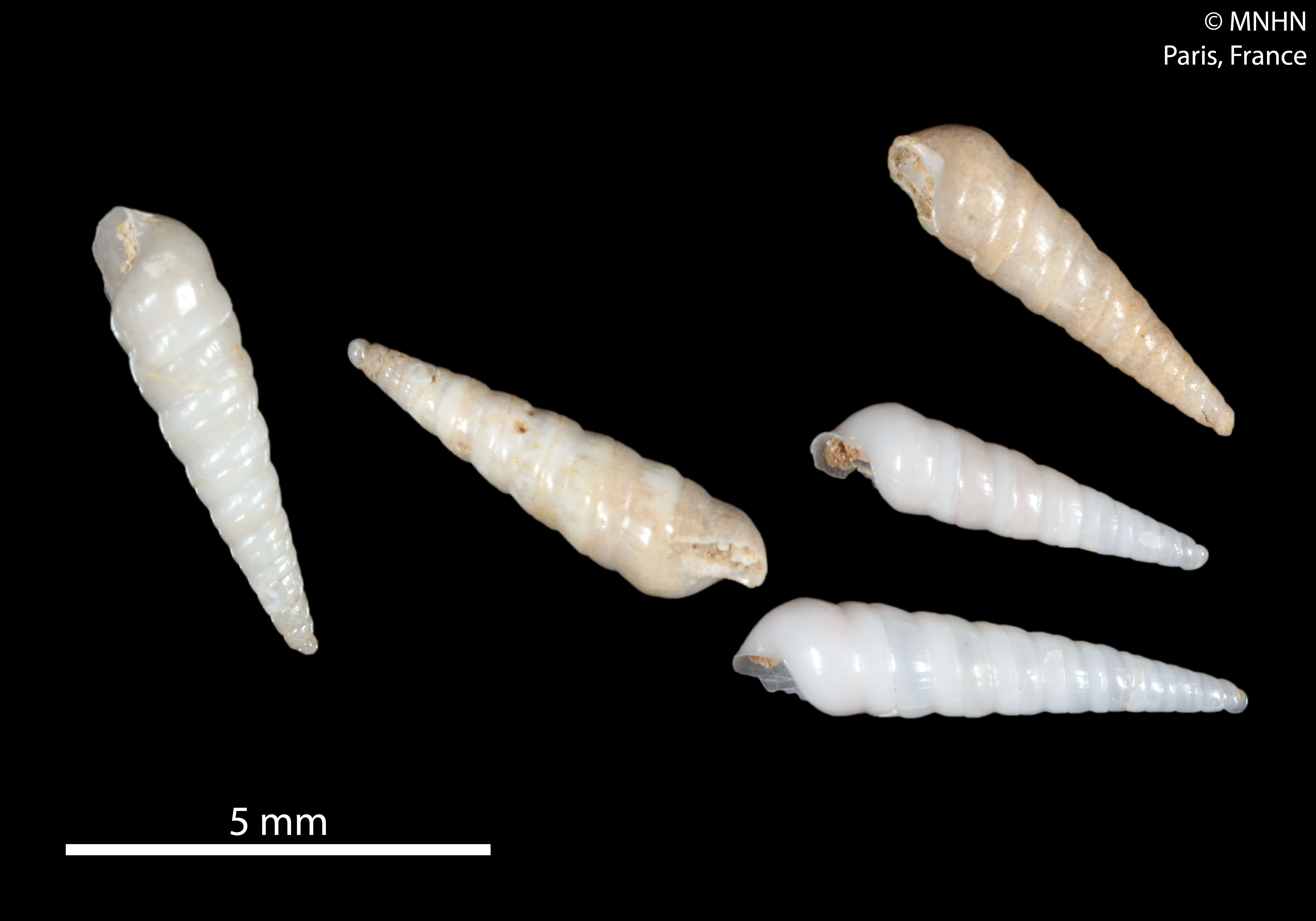
- Shells of Eulimella torquata (paratype at MNHN, Paris)

Scientific classification
- Kingdom: Animalia
- Phylum: Mollusca
- Class: Gastropoda
- Family: Pyramidellidae
- Genus: Eulimella
- Species: E. torquata

Binomial name
- Eulimella torquata Pimenta, Santos & Absalão, 2011

= Eulimella torquata =

Species of gastropod

Eulimella torquata is a species of sea snail, a marine gastropod mollusk in the family Pyramidellidae, the pyrams and their allies.

== Distribution ==
This species occurs in the Atlantic Ocean off southeast Brazil.
