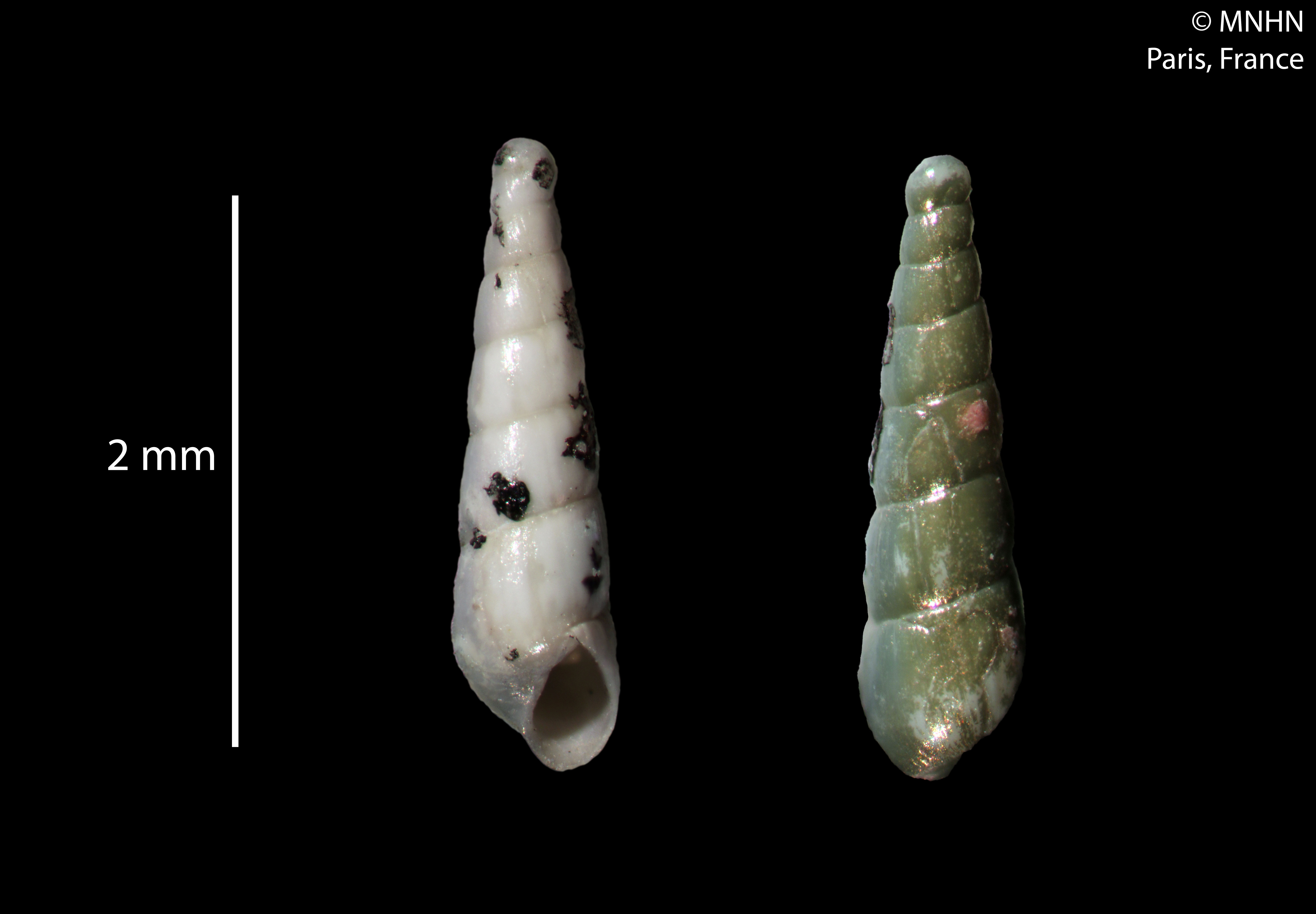
- Shell of Eulimella ejuncida (paratype at MNHN, Paris)

Scientific classification
- Kingdom: Animalia
- Phylum: Mollusca
- Class: Gastropoda
- Family: Pyramidellidae
- Genus: Eulimella
- Species: E. ejuncida

Binomial name
- Eulimella ejuncida Pimenta, Santos & Absalão, 2011

= Eulimella ejuncida =

Species of gastropod

Eulimella ejuncida is a species of sea snail, a marine gastropod mollusk in the family Pyramidellidae, the pyrams and their allies.

== Distribution ==
This marine species occurs in the Atlantic Ocean off southeast Brazil.
