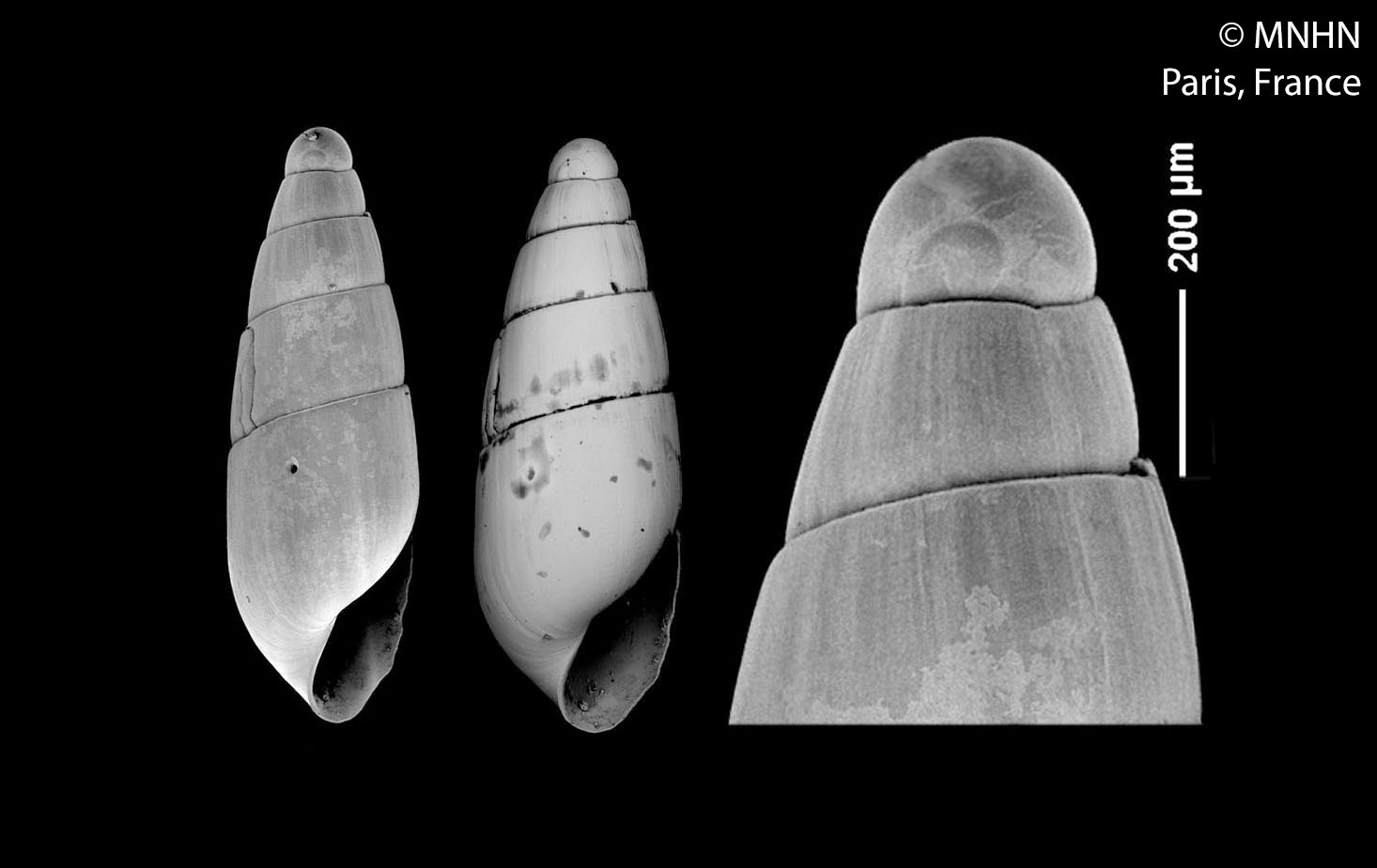
- Shell of Raoulostraca diminuta (holotype at MNHN, Paris)

Scientific classification
- Kingdom: Animalia
- Phylum: Mollusca
- Class: Gastropoda
- Superfamily: Pyramidelloidea
- Family: Pyramidellidae
- Subfamily: Turbonillinae
- Genus: Raoulostraca; Oliver, 1915

Type species
- Raoulostraca inexpectata W. R. B. Oliver, 1915

= Raoulostraca =

Genus of gastropods

Raoulostraca is a genus of sea snails, marine gastropod mollusks in the subfamily Turbonillinae of the family Pyramidellidae, the pyrams and their allies.

== Species ==
Species within the genus Raoulostraca include:

- Raoulostraca diminuta Peñas & Rolán, 2016
- Raoulostraca directa Peñas & Rolán, 2016
- Raoulostraca inexpectata Oliver, 1915
- Raoulostraca laurea Peñas & Rolán, 2016
- Raoulostraca pseudocostata Peñas & Rolán, 2016
- Raoulostraca turrisecclesiae Peñas & Rolán, 2016
