= Melanella chariessa =

- Shell of Melanella chariessa (specimen at Icelandic Museum of Natural History)

Scientific classification
- Kingdom: Animalia
- Phylum: Mollusca
- Class: Gastropoda
- Subclass: Caenogastropoda
- Order: Littorinimorpha
- Family: Eulimidae
- Genus: Melanella
- Species: M. chariessa

Binomial name
- Melanella chariessa A. E. Verrill, 1884

Synonyms
- Eulimella chariessa Verrill, 1884

Species of gastropod

Melanella chariessa is a species of sea snail, a marine gastropod mollusk in the family Eulimidae. The species is one of many species known to exist within the genus, Melanella.

== Description ==
The length of the shell attains 5.6 mm, its diameter 1.8 mm.

(Original description) The small shell is delicate, and translucent white, with a very slender form. The spire gradually attenuates toward the upper end, terminating in a very acute apex.

The shell consists of about eleven whorls. The apical whorl is very small, strongly upturned, and reversed, while the succeeding whorl scarcely exceeds it in size. The suture is slightly but distinctly impressed and only moderately oblique. The whorls are moderately convex across the middle, although they appear somewhat flattened. The surface is nearly smooth and brilliantly polished, lacking any distinct sculpture except for exceedingly fine, microscopic, and rather indistinct flexuous lines of growth, which are usually most apparent near the suture.

The aperture is ovate and narrows posteriorly to a point, where it terminates in a shallow sutural notch. The outer lip is moderately and evenly convex, projecting forward most prominently in the middle; anteriorly, it is slightly produced and somewhat flared. It then merges with the columellar lip in a smooth, regular curve. The columellar margin is regularly excurved and forms a sinuous transition with the edge of the body whorl. The shell lacks an umbilicus.

The coloration is translucent white, sometimes suffused with a faint pinkish tinge.

== Distribution ==
This species occurs in the following locations:

- North West Atlantic
- United Kingdom Exclusive Economic Zone

== Description ==
The maximum recorded shell length is 5.6 mm.

== Habitat ==
Minimum recorded depth is 3229 m. Maximum recorded depth is 3834 m.
