= Eulimella nana =

Scientific classification
- Kingdom: Animalia
- Phylum: Mollusca
- Class: Gastropoda
- Family: Pyramidellidae
- Genus: Eulimella
- Species: E. nana

Binomial name
- Eulimella nana Locard, 1897

Species of gastropod

Eulimella nana is a species of sea snail, a marine gastropod mollusk in the family Pyramidellidae, the pyrams and their allies.
