= Eulimostraca dalmata =

Scientific classification
- Kingdom: Animalia
- Phylum: Mollusca
- Class: Gastropoda
- Subclass: Caenogastropoda
- Order: Littorinimorpha
- Family: Eulimidae
- Genus: Eulimostraca
- Species: E. dalmata

Binomial name
- Eulimostraca dalmata Espinosa & Ortea, 2007

Species of gastropod

Eulimostraca dalmata is a species of sea snail, a marine gastropod mollusk in the family Eulimidae.
