= Eulimella tydemani =

Scientific classification
- Kingdom: Animalia
- Phylum: Mollusca
- Class: Gastropoda
- Family: Pyramidellidae
- Genus: Eulimella
- Species: E. tydemani

Binomial name
- Eulimella tydemani van Aartsen, Gittenberger & Goud, 1998

Species of gastropod

Eulimella tydemani is a species of sea snail, a marine gastropod mollusk in the family Pyramidellidae, the pyrams and their allies.

== Distribution ==
This species occurs in the following locations:

- Cape Verde
