= Eulimella robusta =

Scientific classification
- Kingdom: Animalia
- Phylum: Mollusca
- Class: Gastropoda
- Family: Pyramidellidae
- Genus: Eulimella
- Species: E. robusta

Binomial name
- Eulimella robusta van Aartsen, Gittenberger E. & Goud, 1998

Species of gastropod

Eulimella robusta is a species of sea snail, a marine gastropod mollusk in the family Pyramidellidae, the pyrams and their allies.

== Description ==
The whitish shell has a conical shape with straight sides and a rather obtuse apex. The whorls of the protoconch are flat and orb-like. The teleoconch consists of five to six flat or slightly concave whorls with a somewhat angled periphery. The suture is well-marked. The growth lines are somewhat leaning forward with respect to the direction of the cone. The sculpture shows only fine microscopic spiral striae. The outer lip is straight adapically and gently curved towards the columella, which is nearly straight. The umbilicus is lacking. The columella has no tooth, but only an indistinct fold.

== Distribution ==
This species occurs in the Atlantic Ocean off Mauritania at depths between 167 m and 200m.
