= Eulimostraca subcarinata =

Scientific classification
- Kingdom: Animalia
- Phylum: Mollusca
- Class: Gastropoda
- Subclass: Caenogastropoda
- Order: Littorinimorpha
- Family: Eulimidae
- Genus: Eulimostraca
- Species: E. subcarinata

Binomial name
- Eulimostraca subcarinata d'Orbigny, 1841

Species of gastropod

Eulimostraca subcarinata is a species of sea snail, a marine gastropod mollusk in the family Eulimidae.

== Description ==
The maximum recorded shell length is 5.4 mm.

== Habitat ==
Minimum recorded depth is 0 m. Maximum recorded depth is 192 m.
