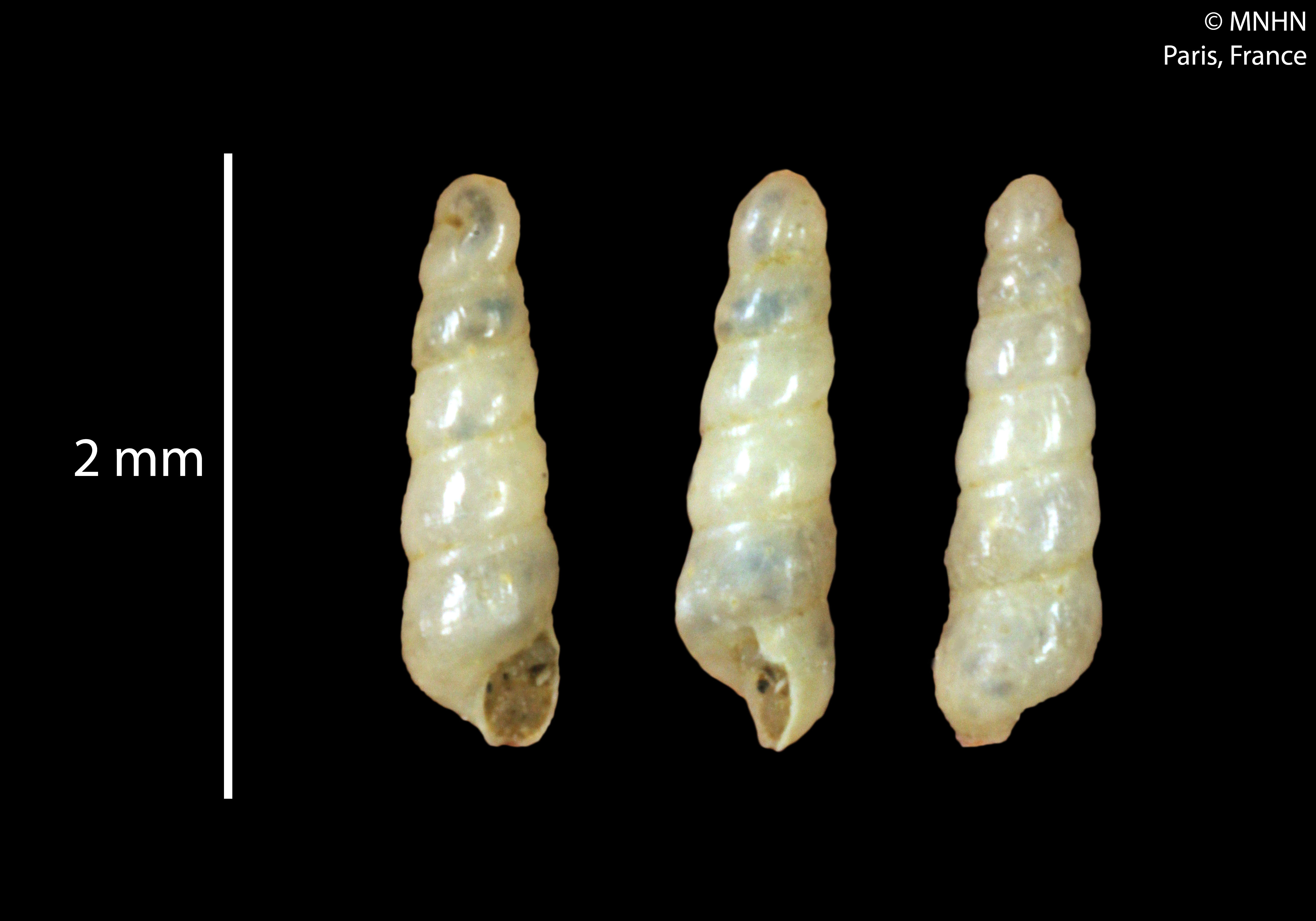
- Shell of Eulimella perturbata (paratype at MNHN, Paris)

Scientific classification
- Kingdom: Animalia
- Phylum: Mollusca
- Class: Gastropoda
- Family: Pyramidellidae
- Subfamily: Turbonillinae
- Tribe: Eulimellini
- Genus: Eulimella
- Species: E. perturbata

Binomial name
- Eulimella perturbata Peñas, Rolán & Swinnen, 2014

Synonyms
- Eulimella monolirata de Folin, 1874 sensu Peñas & Rolán, 1997 (misidentification)

= Eulimella perturbata =

Species of gastropod

Eulimella perturbata is a species of sea snails, a marine gastropod mollusc in the family Pyramidellidae, the pyrams and their allies.

== Distribution ==
This marine species occurs off Mauretania.
