= Eulimella shelaghae =

Scientific classification
- Kingdom: Animalia
- Phylum: Mollusca
- Class: Gastropoda
- Family: Pyramidellidae
- Genus: Eulimella
- Species: E. shelaghae

Binomial name
- Eulimella shelaghae van Aartsen, Gittenberger & Goud, 2000

Species of gastropod

Eulimella shelaghae is a species of sea snail, a marine gastropod mollusk in the family Pyramidellidae, the pyrams and their allies.

The epithet "shelaghae" refers to Mrs Shelagh M. Smith, associated with the National Museums of Scotland, Edinburgh.

== Description ==
The size of the slender conical shell varies between 3.3 mm and 3.5 mm. Its color is white with a green hue. The shell is slightly concave and has a blunt apex. The teleoconch contains five slightly convex whorls, divided by a superficial suture. Sculpture is lacking, except for the orthocline (i.e. at right angles to the growth direction of the cone) growth lines. The aperture is oval. The outer lip is smooth and lacks teeth. There is no umbilicus or columellar tooth.

== Distribution ==
This species occurs in the Atlantic Ocean off Morocco at depths between 700 m and 1520 m
