= Eulimella herosae =

Scientific classification
- Kingdom: Animalia
- Phylum: Mollusca
- Class: Gastropoda
- Family: Pyramidellidae
- Genus: Eulimella
- Species: E. herosae

Binomial name
- Eulimella herosae van Aartsen, Gittenberger & Goud, 2000

Species of gastropod

Eulimella herosae is a species of sea snail, a marine gastropod mollusk in the family Pyramidellidae, the pyrams and their allies.

The epithet "herosae" refers to Mrs V. Héros of the Muséum national d'histoire naturelle, Paris, France.

== Description ==
The size of the slender, conical shell varies between 2.9 mm and 4.3 mm. The apex of the shell is blunt. The color of the shell is whitish to light cream, but has a brown stripe at the boundary between the protoconch and the first whorl. The teleoconch consists of five to six flat whorls with a marked suture between them. These whorls may be slightly concave to somewhat turreted. The shell lacks a columella tooth or teeth on the outer lip. The growth lines are prosocline, i.e. they lean forward (adapically) with respect to the direction of the cone.

== Distribution ==
This species occurs in the following locations:

- Cape Verdes at depths between 160 m and 540 m
