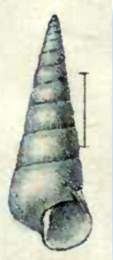
- Drawing of a shell of Eulimella scillae

Scientific classification
- Kingdom: Animalia
- Phylum: Mollusca
- Class: Gastropoda
- Family: Pyramidellidae
- Genus: Eulimella
- Species: E. scillae

Binomial name
- Eulimella scillae (Scacchi, 1835)

Synonyms
- Eulimella macandrei (Forbes, 1844); Melania scillae Scacchi, 1835; Odostomia nisoides Brugnone, 1873; Odostomia scillae (Scacchi, 1835)

= Eulimella scillae =

Species of gastropod

Eulimella scillae is a species of sea snail, a marine gastropod mollusk in the family Pyramidellidae, the pyrams and their allies.

== Description ==
The white shell is rather solid and polished. Its length measures 9 mm. The teleoconch contains 11 to 12 flatly convex whorls. The last whorls are subangulated on the periphery.

== Distribution ==
This species occurs in the following locations: at depths between 99 m and 200 m

- Azores
- Canary Islands
- Cape Verdes
- European waters (ERMS scope)
- Greek Exclusive Economic Zone
- Madeira
- North Europe
- Portuguese Exclusive Economic Zone
- Spanish Exclusive Economic Zone
- United Kingdom Exclusive Economic Zone
- Mauritania
