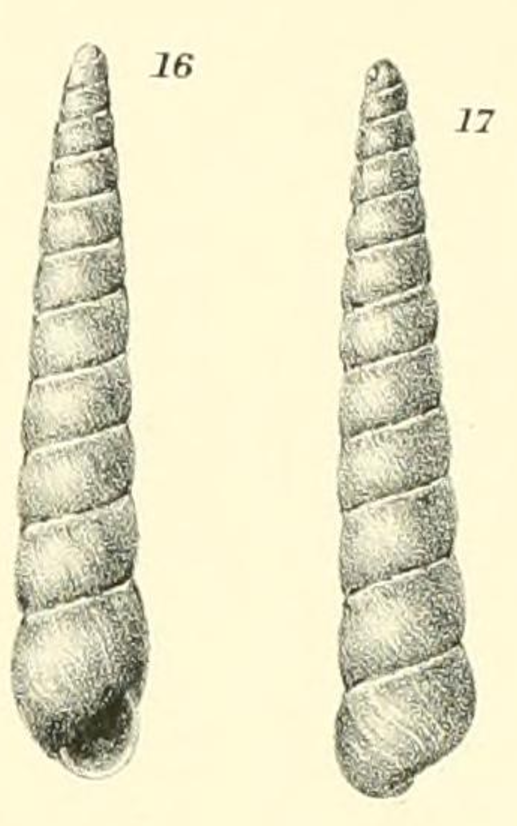

Scientific classification
- Kingdom: Animalia
- Phylum: Mollusca
- Class: Gastropoda
- Family: Pyramidellidae
- Genus: Eulimella
- Species: E. polygyrata

Binomial name
- Eulimella polygyrata Dautzenberg, 1912

= Eulimella polygyrata =

Species of gastropod

Eulimella polygyrata is a species of sea snail, a marine gastropod mollusk in the family Pyramidellidae, the pyrams and their allies.

Its type locality is the western bank of the Îles de Los.
