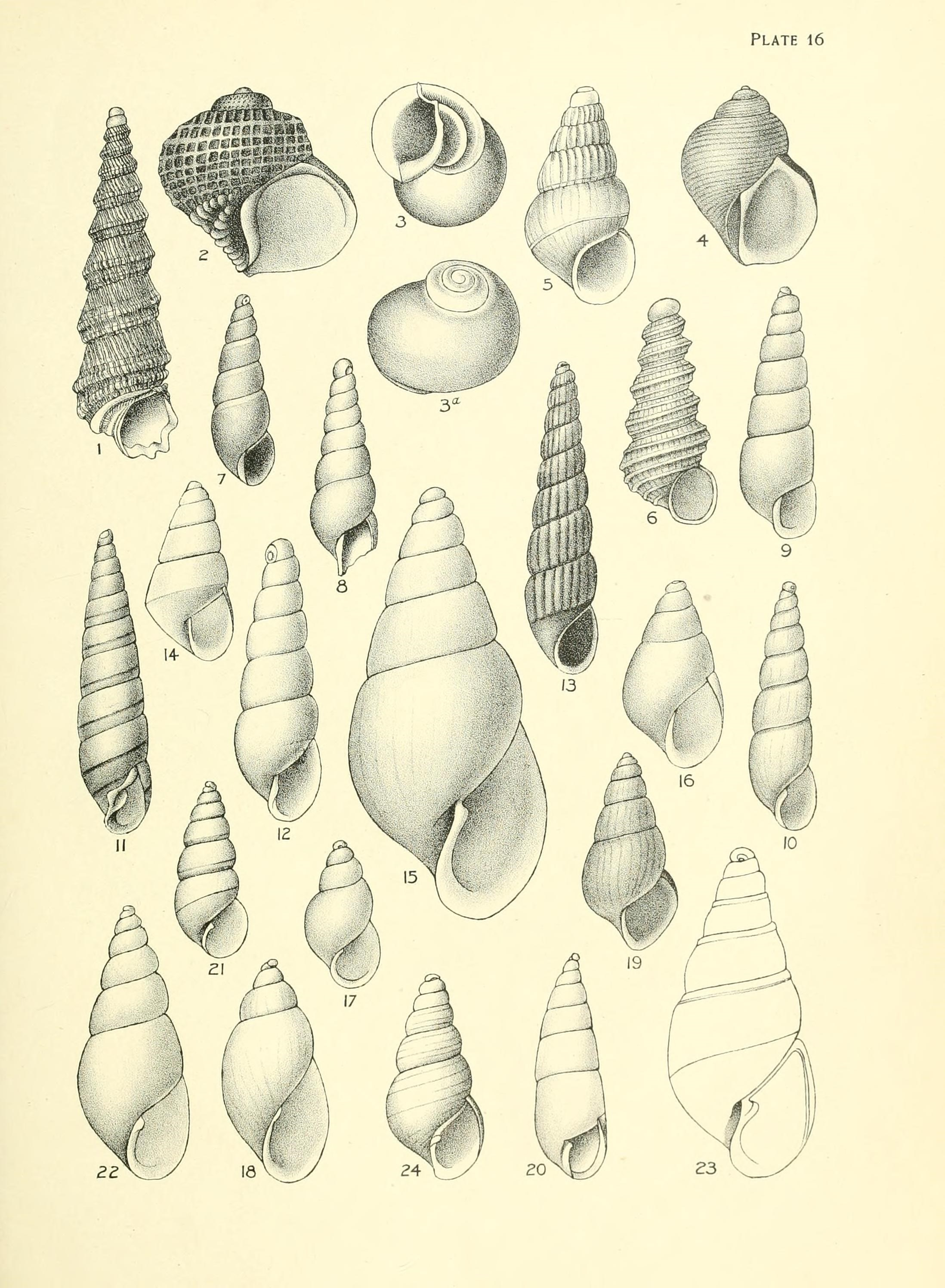

Scientific classification
- Kingdom: Animalia
- Phylum: Mollusca
- Class: Gastropoda
- Family: Pyramidellidae
- Genus: Eulimella
- Species: E. limbata

Binomial name
- Eulimella limbata (Suter, 1907)

= Eulimella limbata =

Species of gastropod

Eulimella limbata is a species of sea snail, a marine gastropod mollusk in the family Pyramidellidae, the pyrams and their allies.
