= Melanella lucida =

- Drawing of a shell of Melanella lucida

Scientific classification
- Kingdom: Animalia
- Phylum: Mollusca
- Class: Gastropoda
- Subclass: Caenogastropoda
- Order: Littorinimorpha
- Family: Eulimidae
- Genus: Melanella
- Species: M. lucida

Binomial name
- Melanella lucida A. E. Verrill, 1884

Synonyms
- Eulimella lucida Verrill, 1884

Species of gastropod

Melanella lucida is a species of sea snail, a marine gastropod mollusk in the family Eulimidae. The species is one of many species known to exist within the genus, Melanella.

== Description ==
The length of the shell attains 8 mm, its diameter 2.3 mm.

(Original description) The shell is rather large for the genus. It is long and slender, with a tall, regularly tapered, acute spire composed of about eleven whorls besides the protoconch, which is small, prominent, and strongly upturned. The whorls are much flattened and but little convex. The suture is distinct, but scarcely at all impressed, especially on the upper half of the spire, and it is not very oblique. The surface is everywhere very smooth and polished, with a very brilliant luster, without any sculpture whatever, and with exceedingly indistinct lines of growth.

The aperture is almost regularly ovate, narrowed posteriorly, where it ends in a slight sutural notch; anteriorly, it is evenly and obtusely rounded. The outer lip is sharp, evenly arched, and projects considerably forward in the middle; in front, it is somewhat produced and flaring, but it passes into the columella-lip in a regular curve. The columella-lip is regularly excurved, with the outer margin somewhat everted. There is no umbilicus. The color is translucent pinkish white.

== Distribution ==
This species occurs in the following locations:

- North West Atlantic (Delaware, USA)
- Ireland, Portugal
- South Africa
