= Eulimostraca linearis =

- Shell of Eulimostraca linearis (holotype at the Natural History Museum, London)

Scientific classification
- Kingdom: Animalia
- Phylum: Mollusca
- Class: Gastropoda
- Subclass: Caenogastropoda
- Order: Littorinimorpha
- Family: Eulimidae
- Genus: Eulimostraca
- Species: E. linearis

Binomial name
- Eulimostraca linearis Carpenter, 1858

Synonyms
- Leiostraca linearis Carpenter, 1858; Melanella (Melanella) linearis (P. P. Carpenter, 1857) · unaccepted > superseded combination

Species of gastropod

Eulimostraca linearis is a species of sea snail, a marine gastropod mollusk in the family Eulimidae.

== Description ==
The length of the shell attains 2.6 mm, its diameter 0.8 mm.

(Described as Melanella (Melanella) linearis) The small shell is very slender, and elongate-conic. It is yellowish-white and highly polished. The surface is marked by exceedingly fine lines of growth only. The shell contains 10 whorls. The first four whorls are well rounded and are separated by a strongly impressed suture. The succeeding whorls, however, are flattened and rather high, with a suture that is scarcely recognizable. The periphery of the body whorl is feebly angulated. The base is rather long and evenly curved.

The aperture is quite large and broadly oval. Its posterior angle is acute. The outer lip is decidedly protracted between the posterior angle and the base. The inner lip is oblique, slightly curved, and revolute, with the upper half appressed to the base. The parietal wall is covered with a thin callus.

== Distribution ==
This species occurs in the Pacific Ocean off California, USA, and Mexico.
