= Terelimella aupouria =

Scientific classification
- Kingdom: Animalia
- Phylum: Mollusca
- Class: Gastropoda
- Family: Pyramidellidae
- Genus: Terelimella
- Species: T. aupouria

Binomial name
- Terelimella aupouria (Powell, 1937)

Species of gastropod

Terelimella aupouria is a species of sea snail, a marine gastropod mollusk in the family Pyramidellidae, the pyrams and their allies.
