= Terelimella benthicola =

Scientific classification
- Kingdom: Animalia
- Phylum: Mollusca
- Class: Gastropoda
- Family: Pyramidellidae
- Genus: Terelimella
- Species: T. benthicola

Binomial name
- Terelimella benthicola Dell, 1956

Species of gastropod

Terelimella benthicola is a species of sea snail, a marine gastropod mollusk in the family Pyramidellidae, the pyrams and their allies.
