= Eulimella digenes =

Scientific classification
- Kingdom: Animalia
- Phylum: Mollusca
- Class: Gastropoda
- Family: Pyramidellidae
- Genus: Eulimella
- Species: E. digenes

Binomial name
- Eulimella digenes (Dautzenberg & Fischer, 1896)

Synonyms
- Turbonilla digenes Dautzenberg & Fischer, 1896

Species of gastropod

Eulimella digenes is a species of sea snail, a marine gastropod mollusk in the family Pyramidellidae, the pyrams and their allies.

== Description ==
The shell size varies between 3 mm and 5 mm. The teleoconch whorls are slightly convex. The orthocline (i.e. at right angles to the growth direction of the cone) growth lines are inverted-S-shaped. The columella lacks a tooth or fold.

== Distribution ==
This marine species occurs in the following locations:

- Azores at a depth of 1385 m
- Cape Verdes at a depth of 930 m
