= Eulimella telum =

Scientific classification
- Kingdom: Animalia
- Phylum: Mollusca
- Class: Gastropoda
- Family: Pyramidellidae
- Genus: Eulimella
- Species: E. telum

Binomial name
- Eulimella telum Schander, 1994

Species of gastropod

Eulimella telum is a species of sea snail, a marine gastropod mollusk in the family Pyramidellidae, the pyrams and their allies. The first samples were found in Africa in 1994.
