= Eulimella lomana =

- Shell of Eulimella lomana

Scientific classification
- Kingdom: Animalia
- Phylum: Mollusca
- Class: Gastropoda
- Family: Pyramidellidae
- Genus: Eulimella
- Species: E. lomana

Binomial name
- Eulimella lomana (Dall, 1908)

Synonyms
- Eulima lomana Dall, 1908; Haliella lomana (Dall, 1908)

Species of gastropod

Eulimella lomana is a species of sea snail, a marine gastropod mollusk in the family Pyramidellidae, the pyrams and their allies.

== Description ==
The length of the remaining whorls of the shell attains 20.2 mm, its diameter 7 mm.

(Original description) The shell is very large, regularly elongate-conic, and creamy white. The early whorls are decollated. The nine succeeding whorls are slightly rounded and very narrowly and feebly shouldered at the summit. They are marked by faint, retractive incremental lines and numerous, very regular, deeply incised, equal, and closely spaced spiral striations. The suture is moderately impressed. The periphery of the body whorl is angulated. The base is moderately long and well rounded, and is marked like the spire. The aperture is large and broadly oval, with a thin outer lip that is fractured at the edge. The inner lip is rendered slightly sinuous by a twist situated a little anterior to its insertion; it is somewhat revolute and entirely free from the base. The parietal wall is covered by a thin callus.

== Distribution ==
This species occurs in the Pacific Ocean off the United States, Mexico and Costa Rica.
