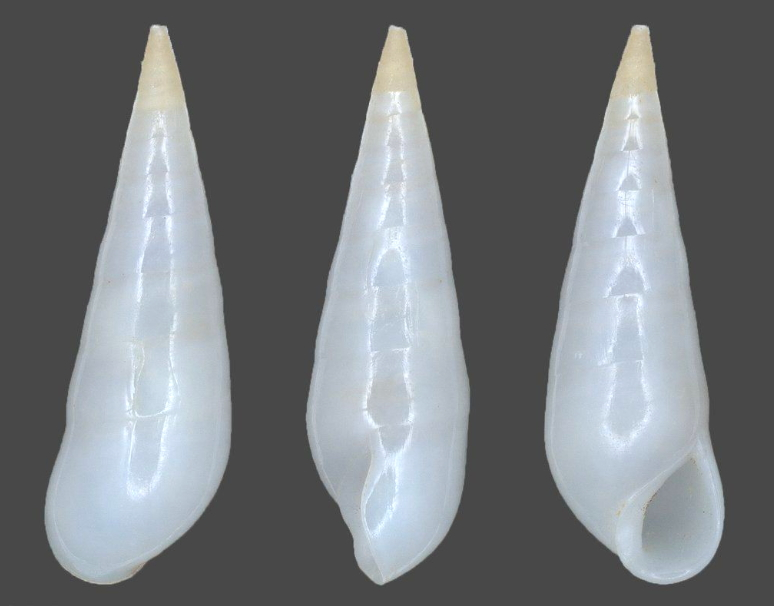
- Shell of Eulimostraca galapagensis (specimen at the Denver Museum of Nature & Science)

Scientific classification
- Kingdom: Animalia
- Phylum: Mollusca
- Class: Gastropoda
- Subclass: Caenogastropoda
- Order: Littorinimorpha
- Family: Eulimidae
- Genus: Eulimostraca; Bartsch, 1917

Type species
- Eulimostraca galapagensis Bartsch, 1917

= Eulimostraca =

Genus of gastropods

Eulimostraca is a genus of small, ectoparasitic sea snails, marine gastropod mollusks in the family Eulimidae.

== General characteristics ==
These are species in which the inner lip is not appressed to the attenuated basal portion of the preceding whorl. The whorls are almost flattened, the outer lip of the aperture is not expanded, and color markings are present.

== Species ==
Species within the genus Eulimostraca include:

- Eulimostraca angusta (Watson, 1886)
- Eulimostraca armonica Espinosa, Ortea, Fernandez-Garcés & Moro, 2007
- Eulimostraca burragei (Bartsch, 1917)
- Eulimostraca dalmata Espinosa, Ortea, Fernandez-Garcés & Moro, 2007
- Eulimostraca encalada Espinosa, Ortea & Magaña, 2006
- Eulimostraca galapagensis Bartsch, 1917
- Eulimostraca indomatta Simone & Birman, 2007
- Eulimostraca linearis (Carpenter, 1858)
- Eulimostraca macleani Warén, 1992
- Eulimostraca subcarinata (d'Orbigny, 1841)

Species brought into synonymy

- Eulimostraca attilioi Hertz & Hertz, 1982: synonym of Niso attilioi (Hertz & Hertz, 1982)
- Eulimostraca bartschi Strong & Hertlein, 1937: synonym of Microeulima bartschi (Strong & Hertlein, 1937)
- Eulimostraca hemphilli [sic]: synonym of Eulimostraca hemphilli [sic] : synonym of Microeulima hemphillii (Dall, 1884)
- Eulimostraca panamensis (Bartsch, 1917): synonym of Eulimostraca burragei (Bartsch, 1917)
- Eulimostraca pusio (A. Adams, 1864): synonym of Leiostraca titania A. Adams, 1861
- Eulimostraca subcarinata Simone & Birman, 2006: synonym of Eulimostraca indomatta Simone & Birman, 2007
