= Eulimella similebala =

Scientific classification
- Kingdom: Animalia
- Phylum: Mollusca
- Class: Gastropoda
- Family: Pyramidellidae
- Genus: Eulimella
- Species: E. similebala

Binomial name
- Eulimella similebala Peñas, Rolán & Swinnen, 2014

Synonyms
- Eulimella similiebala [sic] (misspelling)

Species of gastropod

Eulimella similebala is a species of sea snails, a marine gastropod mollusc in the family Pyramidellidae, the pyrams and their allies.

== Notes ==
Additional information regarding this species:

- Habitat: Known from seamounts and knolls
- European waters (ERMS scope)
