= Eulimella vanderlandi =

Scientific classification
- Kingdom: Animalia
- Phylum: Mollusca
- Class: Gastropoda
- Family: Pyramidellidae
- Genus: Eulimella
- Species: E. vanderlandi

Binomial name
- Eulimella vanderlandi van Aartsen, Gittenberger & Goud, 2000

Species of gastropod

Eulimella vanderlandi is a species of sea snail, a marine gastropod mollusk in the family Pyramidellidae, the pyrams and their allies.

The epithet "vanderlandi" refers to Dr J. van der Land at the Nationaal Natuurhistorisch Museum, Leiden, The Netherlands.

== Description ==
The size of the shell varies between 2 mm and 2.7 mm. The slender, whitish shell has a conical shape with a vague spiral microsculpture. The teleoconch consists of five to six flat whorls. The suture between them is moderately incised. The outer lip is straight, lacking teeth. There is no umbilicus.

== Distribution ==
This species occurs in the following locations:

- Cape Verdes, found at depths between 166 m and 179 m.
