= Eulimella zornikulla =

Scientific classification
- Kingdom: Animalia
- Phylum: Mollusca
- Class: Gastropoda
- Family: Pyramidellidae
- Genus: Eulimella
- Species: E. zornikulla

Binomial name
- Eulimella zornikulla Schander, 1994

Species of gastropod

Eulimella zornikulla is a species of sea snail, a marine gastropod mollusk in the family Pyramidellidae, the pyrams and their allies.

== Description ==
The size of the shell varies between 2 mm and 4.4 mm.

== Distribution ==
This species occurs in the Atlantic Ocean off Mauritania at depths between 19 m and 75 m.
