= Eulimella levilirata =

Scientific classification
- Kingdom: Animalia
- Phylum: Mollusca
- Class: Gastropoda
- Family: Pyramidellidae
- Genus: Eulimella
- Species: E. levilirata

Binomial name
- Eulimella levilirata Murdoch & Suter, 1906

Species of gastropod

Eulimella levilirata is a species of sea snail, a marine gastropod mollusk in the family Pyramidellidae, the pyrams and their allies.
