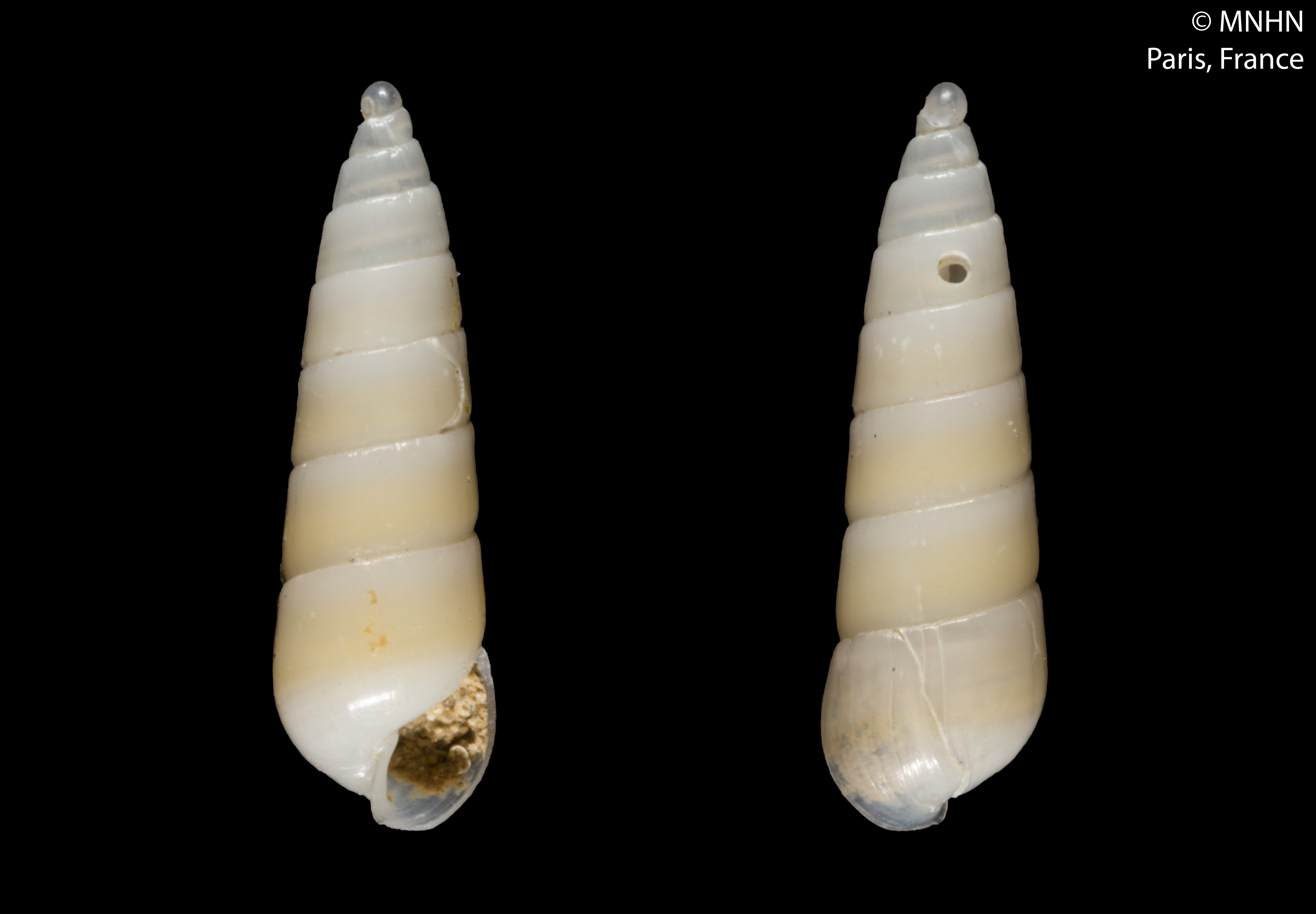
- Shell of Eulimella cylindrata (holotype at MNHN, Paris)

Scientific classification
- Kingdom: Animalia
- Phylum: Mollusca
- Class: Gastropoda
- Family: Pyramidellidae
- Genus: Eulimella
- Species: E. cylindrata

Binomial name
- Eulimella cylindrata Pimenta, Santos & Absalão, 2011

= Eulimella cylindrata =

Species of gastropod

Eulimella cylindrata is a species of sea snail, a marine gastropod mollusk in the family Pyramidellidae, the pyrams and their allies.

== Description ==
The length of the shell attains 4.7 mm. Eulimella cylindrata is a cylindrical shell with a pointed vertex, basically measuring less than 5 mm in length. The shell is smooth and shiny, and usually translucent or transparent in appearance. It has a small aperture (opening) on one end, through which the animal extends its foot and tentacles. The vertex is pointed, and the hole is oval-shaped, usually occupying only a small portion of the shell's length. The shell coloration can fluctuate from light brown to pale yellow or even transparent, and some individuals may have a darker brown band around the base of the shell.

== Distribution ==
This species occurs in the Atlantic Ocean off Southeast Brasil. This species is basically found in shallow waters along the coasts of Europe, from the North Sea to the Mediterranean. It is basically associated with seagrass beds and other types of aquatic vegetation, where it feeds on small planktonic organisms.
