= Eulimella variabilis =

Scientific classification
- Kingdom: Animalia
- Phylum: Mollusca
- Class: Gastropoda
- Family: Pyramidellidae
- Genus: Eulimella
- Species: E. variabilis

Binomial name
- Eulimella variabilis de Folin, 1870

Synonyms
- Eulimella chasteri Dautzenberg, 1912; Obeliscus gracillima Smith, E.A., 1872

Species of gastropod

Eulimella variabilis is a species of sea snail, a marine gastropod mollusk in the family Pyramidellidae, the pyrams and their allies.

== Description ==
The shell grows to a length of 6 mm. This is a very variable species.

== Distribution ==
This species occurs in the Atlantic Ocean off Mauritania at depths between 0 m and 62 m.
