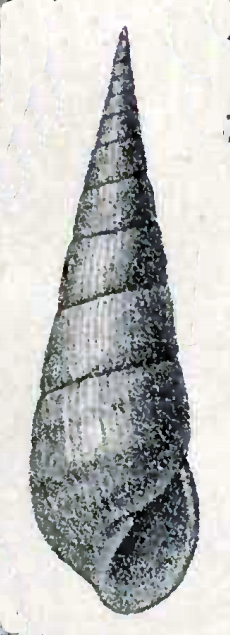
- Drawing of a shell of Eulimella arabica

Scientific classification
- Kingdom: Animalia
- Phylum: Mollusca
- Class: Gastropoda
- Family: Pyramidellidae
- Genus: Eulimella
- Species: E. arabica

Binomial name
- Eulimella arabica Issel, 1869

= Eulimella arabica =

Species of gastropod

Eulimella arabica is a species of sea snail, a marine gastropod mollusk in the family Pyramidellidae, the pyrams and their allies.

== Description ==
The whitish shell has a narrow yellowish band. Its length measures 5 mm. It is shining and translucent. It is very minutely decussated. The 12-13 whorls of the teleoconch are flattened. The suture is impressed and shows a margin.

== Distribution ==
This species occurs in the Red Sea.
