= Eulimella trewae =

Scientific classification
- Kingdom: Animalia
- Phylum: Mollusca
- Class: Gastropoda
- Family: Pyramidellidae
- Genus: Eulimella
- Species: E. trewae

Binomial name
- Eulimella trewae van Aartsen, Gittenberger E. & Goud, 2000

Species of gastropod

Eulimella trewae is a species of sea snail, a marine gastropod mollusk in the family Pyramidellidae, the pyrams and their allies.

The epithet "trewae" refers to Mrs A. Trew who is the curator in charge of the molluscan collection at the National Museum Cardiff

== Description ==
The length of the shell varies between 2.7 mm and 3.5 mm. The white shell has a conical shape with a spiral microstructure and with a blunt top. The protoconch is helicoid. The teleoconch contains six to seven flat whorls with a relatively deep suture and a few axial folds. The inner part of the outer lip is smooth. The umbilicus is lacking.

== Distribution ==
This species occurs in the Atlantic Ocean off Mauritania at depths between 26 mm and 200m.
