= Eulimella quadrasi =

Scientific classification
- Kingdom: Animalia
- Phylum: Mollusca
- Class: Gastropoda
- Family: Pyramidellidae
- Genus: Eulimella
- Species: E. quadrasi

Binomial name
- Eulimella quadrasi Boettger, 1893

Species of gastropod

Eulimella quadrasi is a species of sea snail, a marine gastropod mollusk in the family Pyramidellidae, the pyrams and their allies.
