= Terelimella =

Scientific classification
- Kingdom: Animalia
- Phylum: Mollusca
- Class: Gastropoda
- Family: Pyramidellidae
- Tribe: Eulimellini
- Genus: Terelimella; Laws, 1938

Type species
- Terelimella ototarana Laws, C.R., 1938

Genus of gastropods

Terelimella is a genus of sea snails, marine gastropod mollusks in the family Pyramidellidae, the pyrams and their allies.

== Species ==
Species within the genus Terelimella include:

- Terelimella aupouria (Powell, A.W.B., 1937)
- Terelimella benthicola Dell, R.K., 1956
- Terelimella hutchinsoniana Laws, C.R., 1938
- Terelimella larochei (Powell, 1930)
- Terelimella ototarana Laws, C.R., 1938

== Distribution ==
This marine species is endemic the waters of New Zealand.
