= Melanella compactilis =

- Shell of Melanella compactilis (specimen at Naturalis Biodiversity Center)

Scientific classification
- Kingdom: Animalia
- Phylum: Mollusca
- Class: Gastropoda
- Subclass: Caenogastropoda
- Order: Littorinimorpha
- Family: Eulimidae
- Genus: Melanella
- Species: M. compactilis

Binomial name
- Melanella compactilis (Locard, 1891)

Synonyms
- Eulima compactilis Monterosato, 1884; Eulimella compactilis Locard, 1891

Species of gastropod

Melanella compactilis is a species of sea snail, a marine gastropod mollusk in the family Eulimidae. The species is one of many species known to exist within the genus, Melanella.

== Taxonomy ==
The name was previously credited to Monterosato. The generic name is misprinted Eulimella in the original description, but situated under the heading for Eulima, so deemed to be published in the binomen Eulima compactilis

== Description ==
(Original description in French) The very small shell shows a profile that is almost as slender as that of Eulima subulata (Donovan, 1804) (synonym of Eulima glabra (da Costa, 1778)). The body whorl is more rounded, and the aperture is less narrow. The coloration is a very pale reddish-brown, without any decurrent bands. The height is 4–5 mm and the diameter is 1¾ mm - 2 mm. It is very rare.

== Distribution ==
This species occurs in the following locations:

- European waters (ERMS scope)
- United Kingdom Exclusive Economic Zone
