= Eulimella boydae =

Scientific classification
- Kingdom: Animalia
- Phylum: Mollusca
- Class: Gastropoda
- Family: Pyramidellidae
- Genus: Eulimella
- Species: E. boydae

Binomial name
- Eulimella boydae van Aartsen, Gittenberger & Goud, 2000

Species of gastropod

Eulimella boydae is a species of sea snail, a marine gastropod mollusk in the family Pyramidellidae, the pyrams and their allies.

The epithet "boydae" refers to Ms S. E. Boyd, curator of Mollusca at the Museum of Victoria, Australia.

== Description ==
The size of the elongated shell varies between 2.8 mm and 3.1 mm. The conical shell lacks a spiral microstructure. The teleoconch consists of eight to nine rather low whorls with a clearly marked horizontal suture. The growth lines vary between orthocline (at right angles to the growth direction) and opisthocline (following the growth direction). The outer lip contains some teeth. An umbilicus is lacking. The columella shows a fold.

== Distribution ==
This species occurs in the following locations:

- Cape Verdes at depths between 74 m and 80 m
