= Raoulostraca inexpectata =

Scientific classification
- Kingdom: Animalia
- Phylum: Mollusca
- Class: Gastropoda
- Family: Pyramidellidae
- Genus: Raoulostraca
- Species: R. inexpectata

Binomial name
- Raoulostraca inexpectata Oliver, 1915

Synonyms
- Eulimella inexpectata (Oliver, 1915); Eulimella (Raoulostraca) inexpectata (Oliver, 1915)

Species of gastropod

Raoulostraca inexpectata is a species of sea snail, a marine gastropod mollusk in the family Pyramidellidae, the pyrams and their allies.

== Distribution ==
This marine species occurs off the Kermadec Islands, New Zealand.
