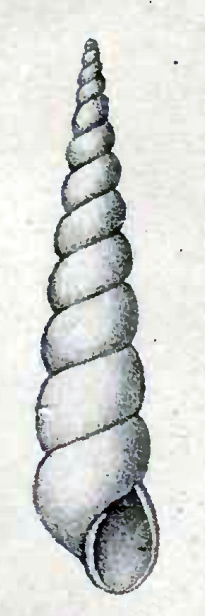
- Drawing of a shell of Eulimella polita

Scientific classification
- Kingdom: Animalia
- Phylum: Mollusca
- Class: Gastropoda
- Family: Pyramidellidae
- Genus: Eulimella
- Species: E. polita

Binomial name
- Eulimella polita (A. E. Verrill, 1872)

Synonyms
- Turbonilla polita (A. E. Verrill, 1872)

= Eulimella polita =

Species of gastropod

Eulimella polita is a species of sea snail, a marine gastropod mollusk in the family Pyramidellidae, the pyrams and their allies.

== Nomenclature ==
The name Eulimella polita (A. E. Verrill, 1872) [for a species from the NW Atlantic] is a secondary junior homonym of Eulimella polita de Folin, 1870 [for a species from West Africa], and thus an invalid name. In such a case, the International Code of Zoological Nomenclature requires that the younger name Eulimella polita (A.E. Verrill, 1872) be replaced by a substitute name. However, there is no substitute name available at this moment (January 2012). Until such a substitute name is established, WoRMS lists provisionally the two species as distinct, although one is designated by an invalid name.

== Description ==
The size of the shell varies between 2 mm and 8.4 mm. This species differs from the other species in this genus by its continuous peristome. The teleoconch contains twelve whorls that are well rounded, smooth and glossy.

== Distribution ==
This species occurs in the following locations:

- Cobscook Bay
- Gulf of Maine
- North West Atlantic Ocean

== Notes ==
Additional information regarding this species:

- Distribution: Cobscook Bay and Eastport, Maine to New Jersey
