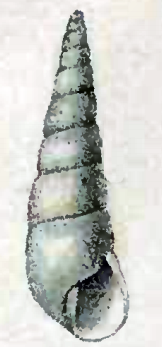
- Drawing of a shell of Eulimella acicula

Scientific classification
- Kingdom: Animalia
- Phylum: Mollusca
- Class: Gastropoda
- Family: Pyramidellidae
- Genus: Eulimella
- Species: E. acicula

Binomial name
- Eulimella acicula (Philippi, 1836)

Synonyms
- Eulima subcylindrata Dunker in Weinkauff, 1862; Eulimella acicula var. intersecta de Folin, 1873; Eulimella aciculata Locard, 1886; Eulimella commutata Monterosato, 1884 (unnecessary replacement name for Melania acicula Philippi, 1836, non Auricula acicula Lamarck, 1815); Eulimella compactilis (Jeffreys, 1867); Eulimella curtata Coen, 1933; Eulimella flagellum Coen, 1933; Eulimella laevis (Brown, 1827); Eulimella schlumbergeri continentalis Nordsieck, 1972; Eulimella subcylindrica Dunker in Weinkauff, 1862; Melania acicula Philippi, 1836; Odostomia scillae var. compactilis Jeffreys, 1867; Pyramis laevis Brown, 1827 (dubious synonym)

= Eulimella acicula =

Species of gastropod

Eulimella acicula is a species of sea snail, a marine gastropod mollusk in the family Pyramidellidae, the pyrams and their allies.

== Description ==
The shell is rather thin, semitransparent, polished, glassy white in live, milk-white in dead specimens. Its length measures 4.3 mm. The teleoconch contains 8-9 narrow whorls. These are flattened with their periphery scarcely angulated.

== Distribution ==
This species is common in the North Atlantic Ocean and in the Mediterranean Sea. It occurs in the following locations: at depths between 99 m and 550 m

- Belgian Exclusive Economic Zone
- European waters (ERMS scope)
- Irish Exclusive Economic Zone
- Portuguese Exclusive Economic Zóne
- North West Coast of Apulea
- Spanish Exclusive Economic Zone
- United Kingdom Exclusive Economic Zone
- Greek Exclusive Economic Zone
- the Canary Islands

== Notes ==
Additional information regarding this species:

- Synonymy: Synonymised with Eulimella laevis (Brown, 1827)
- Monterosato had changed the name to Eulimella. commutata on account of Auricula acicula, Lam., a fossil species which is a very doubtful Eulimella.

The species Eulimella commutata Monterosato, 1884 is now considered by van Aartsen a synonym of Eulimella acicula
