= Eulimella angeli =

Scientific classification
- Kingdom: Animalia
- Phylum: Mollusca
- Class: Gastropoda
- Family: Pyramidellidae
- Genus: Eulimella
- Species: E. angeli

Binomial name
- Eulimella angeli Peñas & Rolán, 1997

Species of gastropod

Eulimella angeli is a species of sea snail, a marine gastropod mollusk in the family Pyramidellidae, the pyrams and their allies.

== Description ==
The helicocone shell grows to a length of 7 mm. Contrary to most other Eulimella species, the inside of the outer lip of a minority of Eulimella angeli specimens shows some teeth in the aperture. The carina at the base of the body whorl is prominent. The opisthocline growth lines of the shell, in the shape of an inverted S, clan clearly be seen.

== Distribution ==
This species occurs in the Atlantic Ocean off Mauritania and Senegal at depths between 18 m and 200 m
