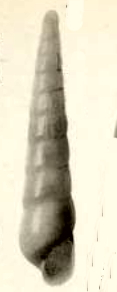
- Shell of Turbonilla schlumbergeri (holotype)

Scientific classification
- Kingdom: Animalia
- Phylum: Mollusca
- Class: Gastropoda
- Family: Pyramidellidae
- Genus: Turbonilla
- Species: T. schlumbergeri

Binomial name
- Turbonilla schlumbergeri Dautzenberg & Fischer H., 1896

Synonyms
- Eulimella schlumbergeri (Dautzenberg & Fischer H., 1896)

= Turbonilla schlumbergeri =

Species of gastropod

Turbonilla schlumbergeri is a species of sea snail, a marine gastropod mollusk in the family Pyramidellidae, the pyrams and their allies.

== Distribution ==
This marine species is endemic to the Azores, found at a depth of 620 m.

== Description ==
The shell of this marine species grows to a length of 7.6 mm.

(Original description in French) This delicate shell exhibits a highly polished surface and a tall, pointed spire composed of nine slightly convex whorls separated by distinct sutures. The body whorl displays a slightly more rounded profile. The aperture is elongated, exhibiting an angular shape at the apex and a rounded form at the base. The columella and outer lip maintain a near-parallel orientation. The outer lip is sharp and positioned perpendicular to the shell's axis. The shell is uniformly white.
