= Melanella conoidea =

- Shell of Melanella conoidea (specimen at the Smithsoninan Institution)

Scientific classification
- Kingdom: Animalia
- Phylum: Mollusca
- Class: Gastropoda
- Subclass: Caenogastropoda
- Order: Littorinimorpha
- Family: Eulimidae
- Genus: Melanella
- Species: M. conoidea

Binomial name
- Melanella conoidea (J. D. Kurtz & W. Stimpson, 1851)

Synonyms
- Eulima conoidea Kurtz & Stimpson, 1851; Odostomia alba Calkins, 1878

Species of gastropod

Melanella conoidea is a species of sea snail, a marine gastropod mollusk in the family Eulimidae. The species is one of many species known to exist within the genus, Melanella.

== Distribution ==
This species occurs in the following locations:

- Caribbean Sea
- Colombia
- Costa Rica
- Cuba
- Gulf of Mexico
- Lesser Antilles
- Mexico
- Puerto Rico
- Venezuela

== Description ==
The maximum recorded shell length is 12.7 mm.

(Original description in Latin) The shell is lanceolate-conical, white, and very glossy. It has 13 whorls, which are flat; the body whorl is subangulate. The aperture is rhomboidal.

== Habitat ==
Minimum recorded depth is 0 m. Maximum recorded depth is 538 m.
