= Halielloides verrilliana =

Scientific classification
- Kingdom: Animalia
- Phylum: Mollusca
- Class: Gastropoda
- Subclass: Caenogastropoda
- Order: Littorinimorpha
- Family: Eulimidae
- Genus: Halielloides
- Species: H. verrilliana

Binomial name
- Halielloides verrilliana Bush, 1909

Species of gastropod

Halielloides verrilliana is a species of sea snail, a marine gastropod mollusk in the family Eulimidae. This species, along with Halielloides fragilis and Halielloides nitidus, belongs to the gastropod genus Halielloides.

== Distribution ==
This species occurs in the following locations:

- North West Atlantic

== Description ==
The maximum recorded shell length is 6.5 mm.

== Habitat ==
Minimum recorded depth is 156 m. Maximum recorded depth is 3718 m.
