= Terelimella larochei =

Scientific classification
- Kingdom: Animalia
- Phylum: Mollusca
- Class: Gastropoda
- Family: Pyramidellidae
- Genus: Terelimella
- Species: T. larochei

Binomial name
- Terelimella larochei (Powell, 1930)

Synonyms
- Eulimella larochei Powell, 1930

Species of gastropod

Terelimella larochei is a species of sea snail, a marine gastropod mollusk in the family Pyramidellidae, the pyrams and their allies.
