= Syrnola vanhareni =

Scientific classification
- Kingdom: Animalia
- Phylum: Mollusca
- Class: Gastropoda
- Family: Pyramidellidae
- Genus: Syrnola
- Species: S. vanhareni

Binomial name
- Syrnola vanhareni (van Aartsen, Gittenberger & Goud, 1998)

Synonyms
- Eulimella vanhareni van Aartsen, Gittenberger & Goud, 1998

Species of gastropod

Syrnola vanhareni is a species of sea snail, a marine gastropod mollusk in the family Pyramidellidae, the pyrams and their allies.

== Distribution ==
This species occurs in the following locations:

- European waters (ERMS scope) : Canary Islands at depths between 200 m and 585 m.
