= Addison Emery Verrill =

American invertebrate zoologist, museum curator and university professor

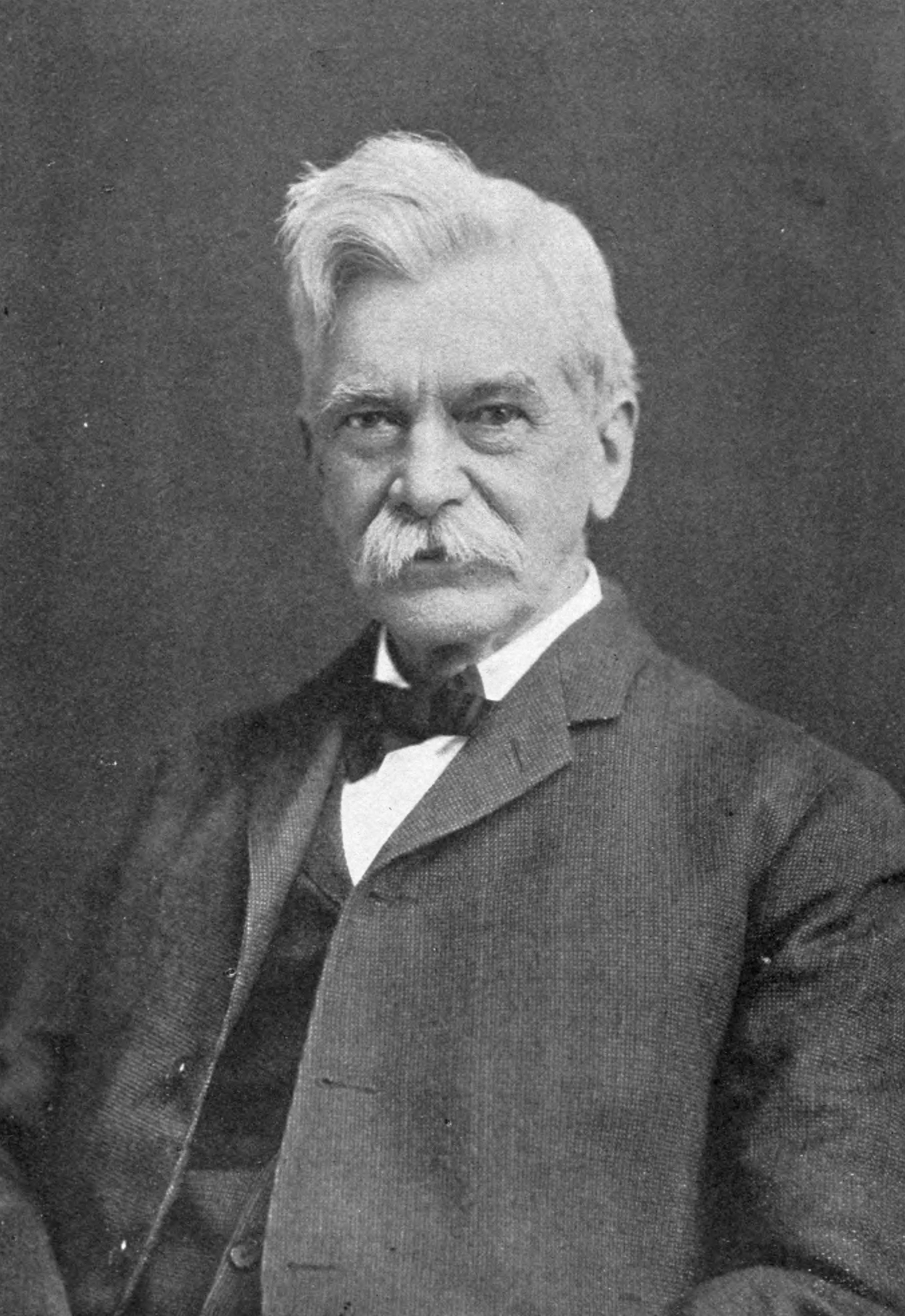
- Born: February 9, 1839; Greenwood, Maine
- Died: December 10, 1926 (aged 87); Santa Barbara, California
- Education: Harvard University
- Scientific career
- Fields: Zoology
- Workplaces: Yale University
- Author abbrev. (zoology): Verrill

Signature
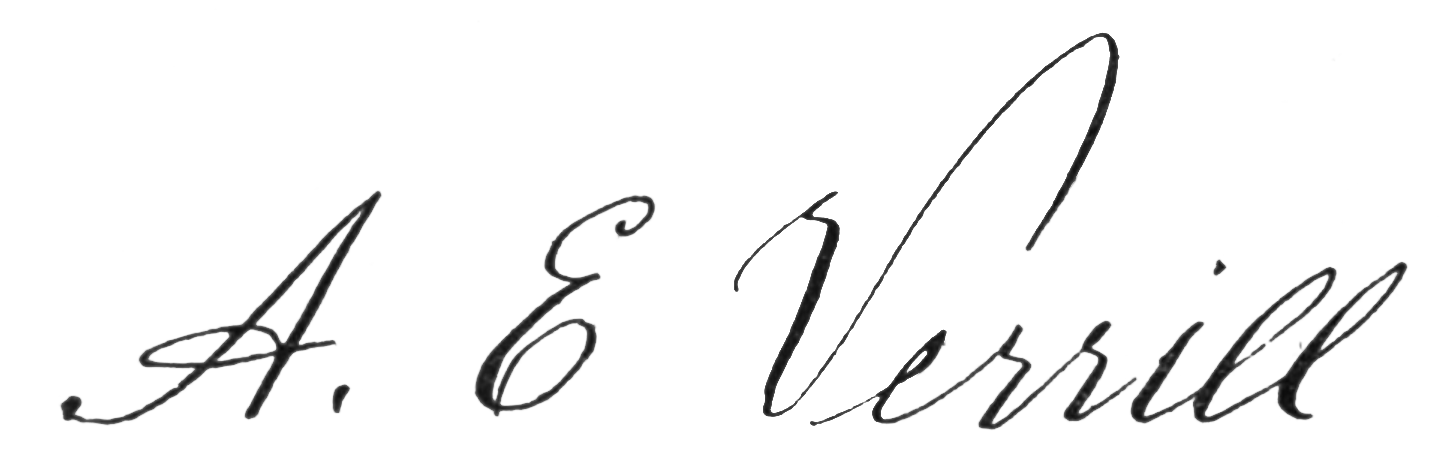

Addison Emery Verrill (February 9, 1839 – December 10, 1926) was an American invertebrate zoologist, museum curator and university professor.

== Life ==
Verrill was born on February 9, 1839, in Greenwood, Maine, the son of George Washington Verrill and Lucy (Hillborn) Verrill. As a boy he showed an early interest in natural history, building collections of rocks and minerals, plants, shells, insects and other animals. He moved with his family to Norway, Maine, at age fourteen where he attended secondary school at the Norway Liberal Institute.

Verrill started college in 1859 at Harvard University and studied under Louis Agassiz. He graduated in 1862 with a B.A. He went on scientific collecting trips with Alpheus Hyatt and Nathaniel Shaler in the summer of 1860 to Trenton Point, Maine, and Mount Desert Island and in the summer of 1861 to Anticosti Island and Labrador. In 1864 Verrill made reports on mining, or prospective mining, properties in New Hampshire, New York, and Pennsylvania. Two years after graduation from Harvard, he accepted a position as Yale University's Sheffield Scientific School first Professor of Zoology, and taught there from 1864 until his retirement in 1907.

In 1861, while under the guidance of Louis Agassiz at Harvard, he was sent to Washington, D.C., to obtain specimens from the Smithsonian institution and promote friendly relations and interest between the scientific men of Washington and those of the Harvard Museum of Comparative Zoology. Under the direction of Spencer Fullerton Baird, Verrill spent almost three months working on the coral collections of the Smithsonian. The process of overhauling the collection required identifying various species, selecting type specimens and making up a set of duplicates to be sent back north to Harvard. While in Washington he became acquainted with many scientists and formed lifelong friendships with a number of them.

The friendship that Verrill and Baird developed, led to the appointment of Verrill as assistant to the Commissioner of Fish and Fisheries in 1871. In this role, which he held till 1887, Verrill was responsible for marine investigations and all invertebrate collections. The estimated several hundred thousand specimens collected between 1871 and 1887 were sent to New Haven for Verrill to sort, identify, catalogue and label. As partial compensation for his work, after the first set of type specimens was sent to the Smithsonian, he was allowed to keep the first set of duplicates as personal property. Upon retirement he sold this personal collection to the Yale Peabody Museum of Natural History, where they now form part of the Invertebrate Zoology collection.

Between 1868–70 he was professor of comparative anatomy and entomology in the University of Wisconsin. From 1860 Verrill investigated the invertebrate fauna of the Atlantic coast, with special reference to the corals, annelids, echinoderms, and mollusks, and became the chief authority on the living cephalopods, especially the giant squid of the North Atlantic.

His Report upon the Invertebrate Animals of Vineyard Sound (1874), with Sidney Irving Smith, whose sister he married, is a standard manual of the marine zoology of southern New England.

In later life he explored with his students the geology and marine animals of the Bermuda Islands. Besides many memoirs and articles on the subjects mentioned above, he published The Bermuda Islands (1903; second edition, 1907).

Verrill published more than 350 papers and monographs, and described more than 1,000 species of animals in virtually every major taxonomy group. He was a member of the Connecticut Academy of Arts and Sciences.

In 1959, Yale's Peabody Museum established the Addison Emery Verrill Medal, awarded for achievement in the natural sciences.

== Family ==
Verrill married Flora Louisa Smith in 1865. They had six children. Their son, Hyatt Verrill, became an author, illustrator and explorer.

== Additional references ==
- Coe, Wesley R. (1927). "Addison Emery Verrill: Pioneer Zoologist". Science. 66 (1697): 28–9. Bibcode:1927Sci....66...28C. doi:10.1126/science.66.1697.28. PMID 17816770.
- Coe, Wesley R. (1932). "Addison Emery Verrill (1839-1926)" (PDF). Biographical Memoirs. 14 (2). National Academy of Sciences.
- Sterling, Keir B., ed. (1997). "Verrill, Addison Emery". Biographical Dictionary of American and Canadian Naturalists and Environmentalists. Greenwood Press.
- Verrill, George Elliot (1958). The Ancestry, Life and Work of Addison E. Verrill of Yale University. Santa Barbara, Calif.: Pacific Coast Pub. Co.
