= Oqaatsut =

Settlement in Greenland

Oqaatsut Hollandshuk / Rødebugt (Danish) Roobay (Dutch)
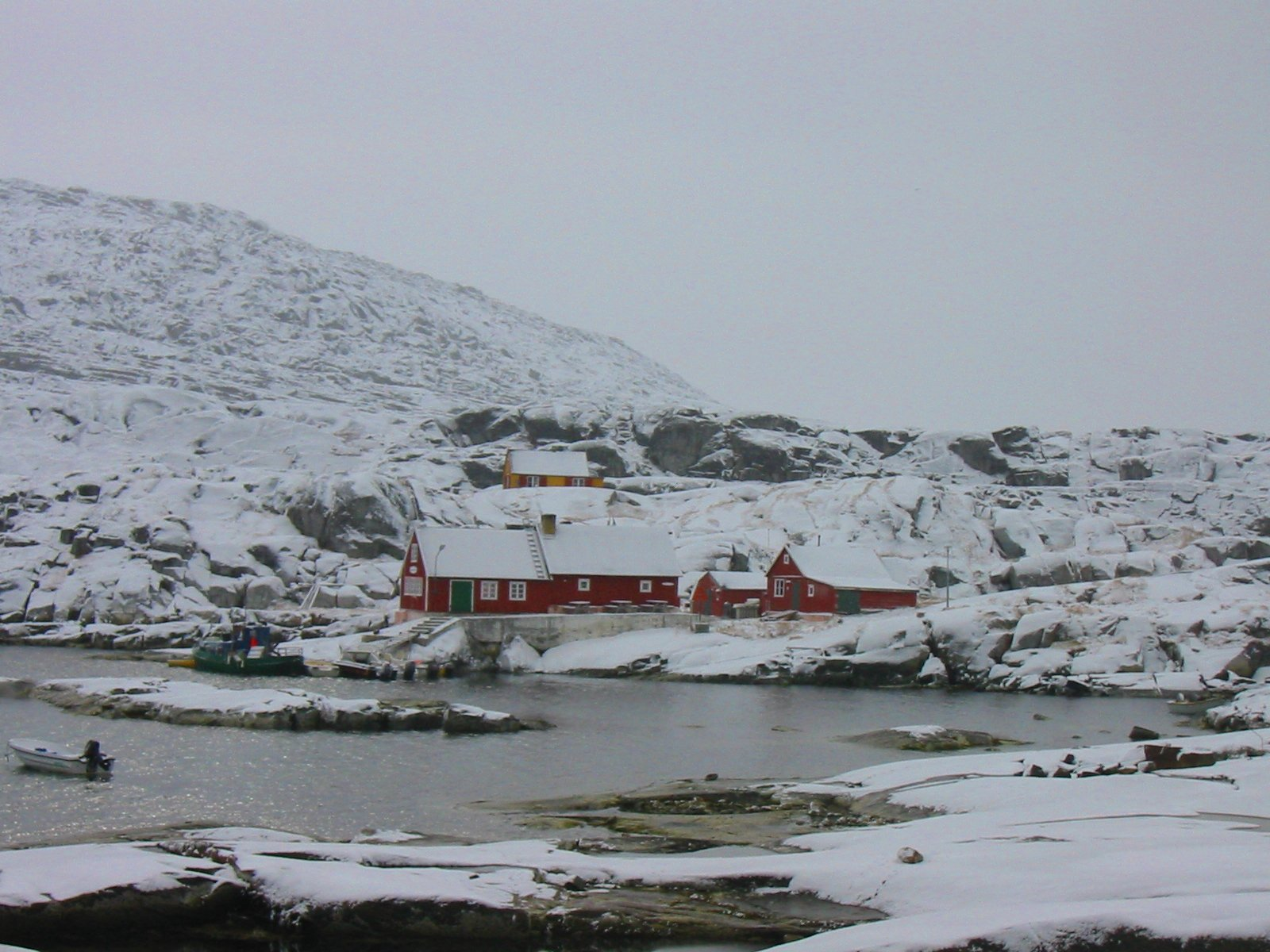
- Rødebugt seen in 2007

- Location within Greenland
- Coordinates: 69°20′40″N 51°00′10″W
- State: Kingdom of Denmark
- Constituent country: Greenland
- Municipality: Avannaata

Government
  - Mayor: Ole Dorph

Population (2025)
  - Total: 42
- Time zone: UTC−02:00 (Western Greenland Time)
  - Summer (DST): UTC−01:00 (Western Greenland Summer Time)
- Postal code: 3952 Ilulissat

Oqaatsut (Danish: Hollandshuk or Rødebugt; Dutch: Roobay) is a settlement in Avannaata municipality, in western Greenland. It had 29 inhabitants in 2020. The modern name of the settlement is Kalaallisut for "Cormorants". The village is served by the communal all-purpose Pilersuisoq store.

== Geography ==
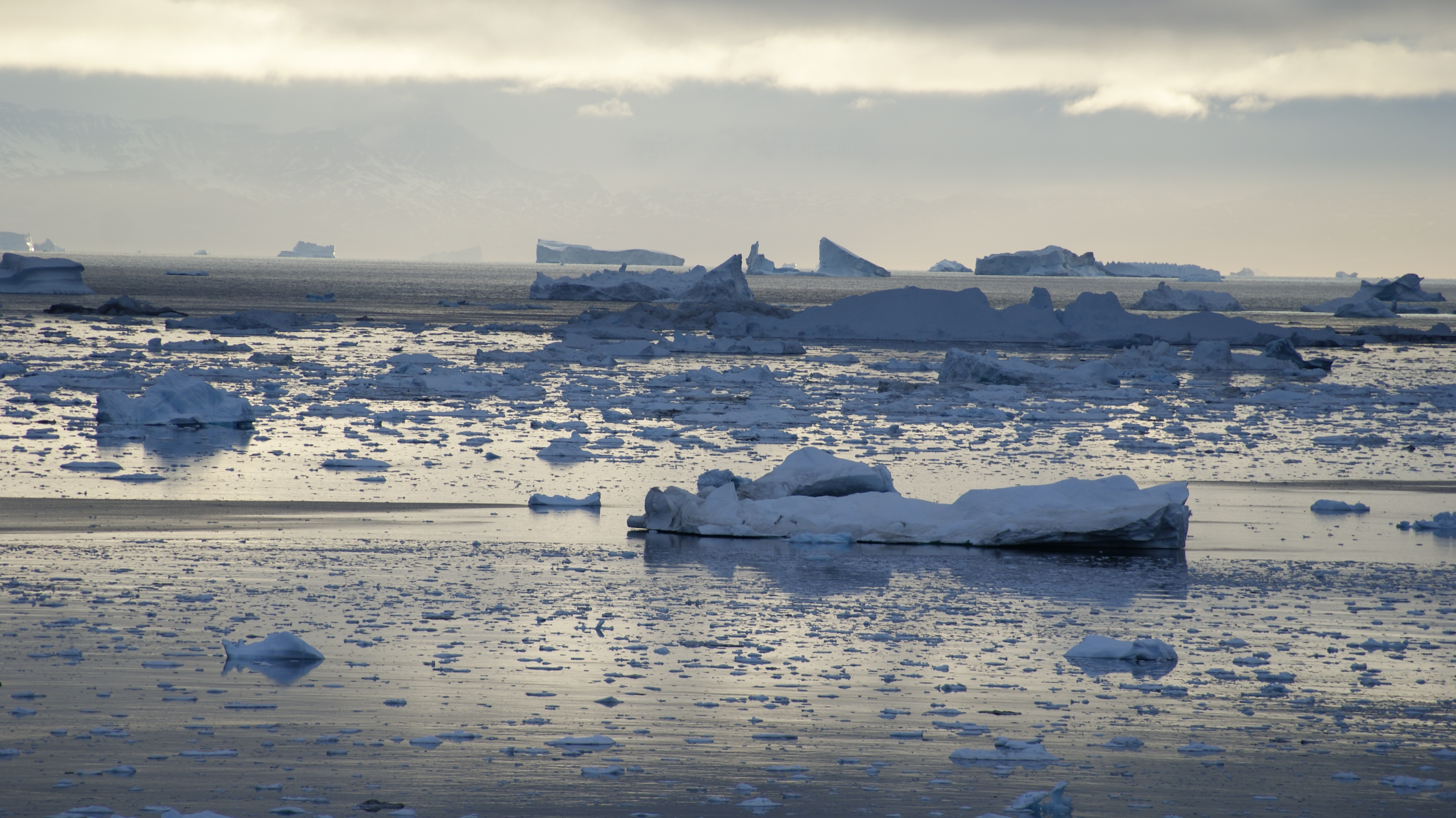
Icebergs from the Ilulissat Icefjord float north with the West Greenland Current towards Baffin Bay, to then return south along the coast of Baffin Island and Labrador Peninsula

The settlement is located on a small peninsula jutting off the mainland into western Disko Bay (Greenlandic: Qeqertarsuup Tunua), 14 km north of Ilulissat. The settlement itself faces the shore of the small Akuliarusinnguaq bay, bounded to the north by Qeqertaq island, one of several islands with that name − 'qeqertaq' means 'island' in Greenlandic.

Further to the east, the Paakitsup Nunaa highland on the mainland separates the area from Sikuiuitsoq Fjord. Sermeq Avannarleq, a glacier flowing from the Greenland ice sheet empties into the fjord approximately 22 km east of Oqaatsut. Paakitsup Nunaa gives way to a marshy lowland in the south, with several lakes, the largest of which are Qoortusuup Tasia, Kuuttaap Tasia, and Kangerluarsuup Tasia Qalleq.

Further south, the highlands of Iviangernarsuit and Akinnaq due east of Ilulissat Airport are split by the Uujuup Kuua river valley. To the north, the waters of Disko Bay channel into the Sullorsuaq Strait between the large Alluttoq Island and Disko Island (Greenlandic: Qeqertarsuaq).

== History ==
The settlement first operated as Rodebay, a trading post for 18th-century Dutch whalers. The original blubber house, cooperage, and storehouse are still in use. When the fish processing plant of Royal Greenland providing employment to the majority of families was closed, Oqaatsut found itself on the verge of depopulation. In 2000 a new fishing company (Rodebay Fish ApS) was founded by the local fishermen, ensuring survival of the settlement.

== Transport ==
Due to the proximity of Ilulissat Airport, there is no air connection between Oqaatsut and Ilulissat. Air Greenland operates government contract flights to villages farther north: Qeqertaq and Saqqaq. Settlement flights in the Disko Bay are unique in that they are operated only during winter and spring.

During summer and autumn, when the waters of Disko Bay are navigable, communication between settlements is by sea only, serviced by Diskoline. The ferry links Oqaatsut with Qeqertaq, Saqqaq, and Ilulissat.

== Population ==
The population of Oqaatsut has decreased by a quarter since the 1990 levels, levelling off in the 2000s.

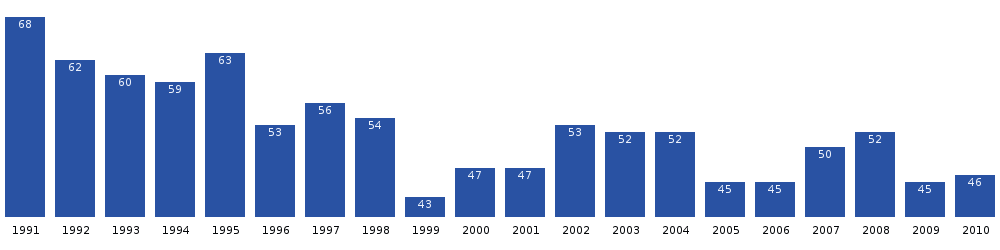
Oqaatsut population growth dynamics in the last two decades. Source: Statistics Greenland
