= Paleotsunami =

Tsunami, possibly before written history

A paleotsunami is a tsunami that occurred before written history where there are no documented observations. Paleotsunamis are evidenced by modern technology and scientific research. One of the largest was a megatsunami resulting from the asteroid that wiped out the dinosaurs.

Studying paleotsunamis is an emerging science to identify and interpret paleotsunami deposits. There are several recorded paleotsunami records, though some are known only by historical mentions, such as tsunamis resulting from the 1700 Cascadia earthquake which is known only from oral traditions among the Native Americans of the Pacific Northwest and simultaneous Japanese accounts of the same event.

== Historical occurrences ==
=== Chile ===
On the coast of Chile, boulders have been found that "suggest directionality from sea to land," and they "could not be transported by rolling."

On the northern Chilean coast, probable evidence of a tsunami exist as one boulder on the sand high above the Pacific can be found, dwarfing every other rock in view in a conspicuous manner. Based on the effects of a tsunami that hit Japan, a tsunami 20 m (66 ft) probably hit the Chilean coast in AD 1420, which swept boulders inland as if they were pebbles.

The 1420 Caldera earthquake generated tsunamis reaching Japan.

In the sea off of the Atacama near Caldera, on April 11, 1819, there was a magnitude 8.5 earthquake. It lasted roughly 7 min and almost completely demolished the city of Copiapó. A tsunami with waves up to 4 metres (13 ft) high was registered. It had reached all coasts within a radius of 800 kilometres (500 mi), including Hawaii.

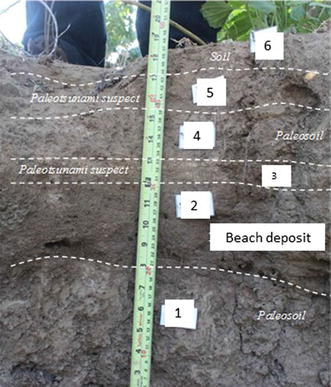
Age determination of paleotsunami sediments around Lombok Island, Indonesia, and identification of their possible tsunamigenic earthquakes.

=== New Zealand ===
In New Zealand, large boulders have been found close to 1 kilometre (0.62 mi) inland. No tsunami appears in historical records, but it is estimated to have occurred around 1777 BC. It likely hit islands all across the South Pacific, including the Cook Islands, Tonga, and Vanuatu. Paleotsunami researchers do not yet know the full scale of the destruction the tsunami caused.

=== China ===
A tsunami struck in AD 1076 in southern China, during the Song dynasty and nearly wiped out civilization in what is now Guangdong. On Lincoln Island of the Paracel chain in the South China Sea, large rocks and coral have been deposited on the island far away from the coast which can be explained to be moved there due to the tsunami. The earthquake causing it was probably in the Manila Trench. Historical record show that earthquake activity was largely cut off and major activity did not resume for centuries.

There is evidence of paleotsunami events occurring on Taiwan.

=== The Cascadia subduction zone ===
Off the coast of the American Northwest, the 1700 Cascadia earthquake generated a tsunami. It was recorded in Japan. The Indigenous peoples of the Pacific Northwest Coast carried the story on in many oral traditions, though they left no written records. There are records of several paleotsunamis hitting the southwest coast of Canada, northwest coast of the United States through northern California.

=== Eastern Mediterranean ===
In the Eastern Mediterranean, there has been evidence found of paleotsunamis occurring. A 2020 study found marine sand and shells within ancient wetland deposits at Tel Dor, Israel, as evidence of a tsunami between 9,910 and 9,290 years ago. The researchers estimated that the tsunami travelled around 1.5-3.5 kilometers inland from the coastline at the time.

== List of historic paleotsunamis ==
Year	Location	Main Article	Primary Cause	Description
≈3,260 Ma	South Africa	S2 impact	Impact event	An astronomical object between 37 and 58 kilometres (23 and 36 mi) wide traveling at 20 kilometres per second (12 mi/s) struck the Earth east of what is now Johannesburg, South Africa, near South Africa's border with Eswatini, in what was then an Archean ocean that covered most of the planet, creating a crater about 500 kilometres (300 mi) wide. The impact generated a megatsunami that probably extended to a depth of thousands of metres beneath the surface of the ocean and rose to the height of a skyscraper when it reached shorelines.
≈66 Ma	Yucatán Peninsula	Chicxulub event	Impact event	An asteroid 10 kilometres (6 mi) in diameter struck the Earth, generating a megatsunami with an initial wave height of 1,500 metres (5,000 ft) which struck coastlines in the Gulf of Mexico with waves 100 metres (300 ft) tall and reached heights of up to 14 metres (46 ft) in the North Atlantic and South Pacific. The impact also triggered giant landslides and slumps which produced additional megatsunamis of various sizes in the region, and seismic waves from it caused seiches of 10 to 100 metres (30 to 300 ft) in height in an inland sea at Tanis, 3,000 kilometres (2,000 mi) away.
≈5.33 Ma	Algeciras, Spain	Zanclean Flood	Reservoir-induced seismicity	At the end of or shortly after the Zanclean Flood, which rapidly filled the Mediterranean Basin with water from the Atlantic Ocean, a megatsunami with a height of nearly 100 metres (300 ft) struck the coast of Spain near what is now Algeciras.
≈1.4 Ma	Molokai, Hawaii	East Molokai Volcano	Landslide	One-third of the East Molokai volcano collapsed into the Pacific Ocean, generating a tsunami with an estimated local height of 600 metres (2,000 ft). The wave traveled as far as California and Mexico.
≈220,000–170,000 BC	Tenerife, Canary Islands	Mount Teide	Eruption and landslide	A destructive series of eruptions caused a large collapse of part of the northern flank of the island and the central pre-Teide volcanic structure (known as the Cañadas edifice), causing a megatsunami in two phases, leaving deposits 132 metres (433 ft) high on the north-west of the island.
≈103,000 BC	Hawaii		Submarine landslide	A tsunami at least 400 metres (1,300 ft) in height deposited marine sediments at a modern-day elevation of 326 metres (1,070 ft) – 375 to 425 metres (1,230 to 1,394 ft) above sea level at the time the wave struck – on Lanai. The tsunami also deposited such sediments at an elevation of 60 to 80 metres (200 to 260 ft) on Oahu, Molokai, Maui, and the island of Hawaii.
≈71,000 BC	Cape Verde Islands		Landslide	The eastern flank of the island of Fogo collapsed into the sea, generating a megatsunami. The wave struck Santiago, 55 kilometres (34 mi; 30 nmi) away, where it was at least 170 metres (560 ft) tall and had a run-up height of 270 metres (890 ft). The wave deposited giant boulders on Santiago at elevations of up to 220 metres (720 ft) and as far as 650 metres (2,100 ft) inland.
≈7,910–7,290 BC	Dor, Israel		Unknown	A megatsunami had a run-up of at least 16 metres (52 ft) and traveled between 1.5 and 3.5 km (0.9 and 2.2 mi) inland from the ancient Eastern Mediterranean coast.
≈7000–6000 BC	Lisbon, Portugal		Unknown	A series of giant rocks and cobblestones have been found 14 metres (46 ft) above mean sea level near Guincho Beach.
≈6370 BC	Eastern Mediterranean		Unknown	A 25-cubic-kilometre (6 cu mi) landslide on the eastern slope of Mount Etna in Sicily reached the Mediterranean Sea and triggered a megatsunami in the Eastern Mediterranean with an initial wave height of 40 metres (130 ft) along the eastern coast of Sicily, where it felled millions of trees. Models indicate it had heights of 30 metres (100 ft) near Syracuse, Sicily; 15 to 34 metres (49 to 110 ft) along the southern coast of Italy; 20 metres (70 ft) along the southeastern coast of Sicily; 15 metres (50 ft) at the northeastern tip of Sicily; 18 metres (59 ft) at Malta; 12 metres (39 ft) on the western coast of Greece; 6 metres (20 ft) in southern Greece; 5 to 10 metres (16 to 33 ft) along the coast of Libya; 1 metre (3 ft) on the south coast of Crete; 0.5 metres (2 ft) at Cyprus; and 2.5 metres (8 ft) at the Neolithic village of Atlit Yam off the coast of Israel, prompting the village's permanent abandonment.
≈6225–6170 BC	Norwegian Sea	Storegga Slide	Landslide	The Storegga Slides, 100 kilometres (60 mi) northwest of the coast of Møre in the Norwegian Sea, triggered a large tsunami in the North Atlantic Ocean. The collapse involved around 290 kilometres (180 mi) of coastal shelf, and a total volume of 3,500 km^{3} (840 cu mi) of debris. Based on carbon dating of plant material in the sediment deposited by the tsunami, the latest incident occurred around 6225–6170 BC. In Scotland, traces of the tsunami have been found in sediments from Montrose Basin, the Firth of Forth, up to 80 kilometres (50 mi) inland and 4 metres (13 ft) above current normal tide levels.
≈5650 BC	Alluttoq Island, Greenland		Landslide	A large landslide into Sullorsuaq Strait (known in Danish as Vaigat Strait) generated a megatsunami which had a run-up height of 41 to 66 metres (130 to 220 ft).
≈5350 BC	Alluttoq Island, Greenland		Landslide	A large landslide into Sullorsuaq Strait (known in Danish as Vaigat Strait) generated a megatsunami which had a run-up height of 45 to 70 metres (148 to 230 ft).
5,500 BP	Northern Isles, Scotland	Garth tsunami	Unknown	The tsunami may have been responsible for contemporary mass burials.
≈1800 BC	Chile		Earthquake	A magnitude 9.5 earthquake generated tsunamis 15 to 20 metres (50 to 70 ft) in height that struck 1,000 kilometres (600 mi) of the coastline of the Atacama Desert. People fled the area and did not begin to return until around 800 BC; some pre-tsunami settlements were not reoccupied until between 1000 and 1500 AD.
≈1600 BC	Santorini, Greece	Minoan eruption	Volcanic eruption	The volcanic eruption in Santorini, Greece triggered tsunamis which caused damage to some Minoan sites in eastern Crete.
1171 BC	Baltic Sea		Unknown	A tsunami with wave heights of at least 10 metres (30 ft) had run-up heights in Sweden of up to 14.5 to 16.5 metres (48 to 54 ft).
≈1100 BC	Lake Crescent, Washington, United States		Landslide	An earthquake generated the 7,200,000-cubic-metre (9,400,000 cu yd) Sledgehammer Point Rockslide, which fell from Mount Storm King and entered waters at least 140 metres (460 ft) deep, generating a megatsunami with an estimated maximum run-up height of 82 to 104 metres (270 to 340 ft).

== Future implications ==
Scientists continue to find evidence of ancient tsunamis larger than those recorded in historical records.

The tsunami caused by the 2011 Tōhoku earthquake is a prime example of the dangers of ignoring evidence of past tsunamis. It was generated by a megathrust earthquake and made tsunamis up to 40 metres (130 ft) high. It washed over sea walls and drowned over 100 designated tsunami evacuation sites. From historical records, there were three large tsunamis dating back as far as the 17th century, some producing waves dozens of meters high. However, the Japanese based many of their tsunami-defense preparations on smaller tsunamis that had previously hit Japan. In 2011, tsunamis destroyed entire cities, crippling the Fukushima Daiichi Nuclear Power Plant. Over 15,000 people were killed by the tsunami. Not long before the Tōhoku earthquake, the Japanese had set up tsunami stones, warning of tsunami danger. One reads "High dwellings are the peace and harmony of our descendants. Remember the calamity of the great tsunamis. Do not build any homes below this point."

== Megatsunami on other planets ==
The surface of Mars once had oceans but is now dry, and a 2019 study found a paleotsunami may have ravaged some of the surface after a cosmic impact similar to the one that created the Chicxulub crater and likely ended Earth's age of dinosaurs. The impact may have made Pohl Crater. Near where Viking I landed were many boulders, possible debris from a megatsunami, which may have struck perhaps 3.4 billion years ago. The megatsunami could have reached 930 miles (1,500 km) from the impact site, well past Viking 1's landing site. The tsunami may have been 1,640 feet (500 m) high on the ocean, and perhaps 820 feet (250 m) on land.

What happened was possible via two different scenarios, one caused by a 5.6 miles (9.0 km) asteroid meeting "strong ground resistance," releasing 13 million megatons of TNT energy, or a 1.8 miles (2.9 km) asteroid hitting the softer ground, releasing 0.5 million megatons of TNT energy.

== See also ==
- Cascadia subduction zone
- List of tsunamis
- Megathrust earthquake
- Megatsunami
- NOAA Center for Tsunami Research
- Pacific Tsunami Warning Center
- Paleoseismology
- Submarine earthquake
- Teletsunami
- Tsunami deposit
- Tsunami earthquake
- Tsunami warning system
- Tsunamis in lakes

== External links and references ==
- https://paleoseismicity.org
- The USGS on paleotsunamis
- Paleotsunami Research—Current Debate and Controversies
- How likely is it that a mega-tsunami strikes Hawaii?
- Chapter 3 – Paleotsunami Research—Current Debate and Controversies
- Age determination of paleotsunami sediments around Lombok Island, Indonesia, and identification of their possible tsunamigenic earthquakes
- How Big Were Ancient Tsunamis? Paleotsunami Researchers Examine Olden Disasters
- In search of Holocene trans-Pacific palaeotsunamis
- Paleotsunami History Recorded in Holocene Coastal Lagoon Sediments, Southeastern Sri Lanka
- Tsunami Deposits in the US Pacific Northwest
- Paleotsunami research along the Nankai Trough and Ryukyu Trench subduction zones – Current achievements and future challenges
- Paleotsunami history of Hachinohe, northern Japan: a multiproxy analysis and numerical modeling approach
- USGS: Paleotsunami
