= 1955 Greenlandic Provincial Council election =

Provincial Council elections were held in Greenland in 1955.

== Electoral system ==
Members of the Provincial Council were elected by first-past-the-post voting in 13 single-member constituencies.

== Elected members ==
Constituency	Elected member
Aasiaat	Ole Brandt
Bugten	Frederik Jensen
Kangaatsiaq	Nikolaj Karlsen
Maniitsoq	Lars Møller
Nanortalik	Jakob Nielsen
Narsaq	Carl Egede
Nuuk	Peter Nielsen
Paamiut	Erling Høegh
Qaqortoq	Klaus Lynge
Qullissat	Carl Olsen
Sisimiut	Jørgen C. F. Olsen
Upernavik	Ole Nielsen
Uummannaq	Edvard Kruse
Source: Kjœr Sørensen

== Aftermath ==
Carl Egede was unable to attend sessions in March 1959, with Lars Motzfeldt acting as a substitute.
