= Ataa =

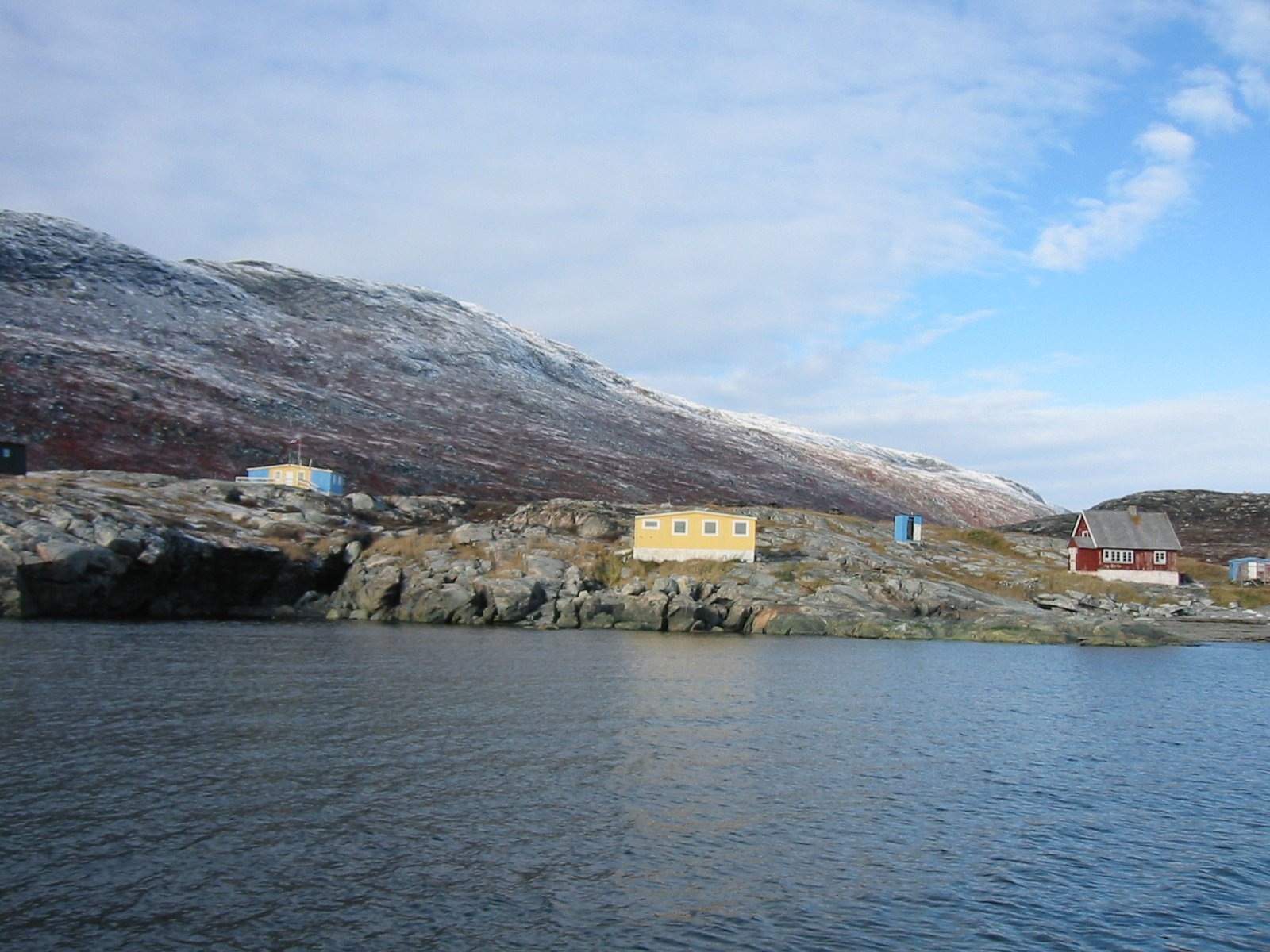
- Abandoned buildings in Ataa

- Location within Greenland
- Coordinates: 69°45′31.5″N 50°56′06.6″W
- Sovereign state: Kingdom of Denmark
- Autonomous country: Greenland
- Municipality: Avannaata
- Abandoned: 1960
- Time zone: UTC-03

Ataa was a settlement in the Disko Bay region of western Greenland. It was located on the eastern coast of Alluttoq Island, approximately 60 km (37 mi) to the north of Ilulissat and 30 km (19 mi) to the southeast of Qeqertaq.

== History ==
The settlement was abandoned around 1960. It served as a backdrop for the 1997 Danish film Smilla's Sense of Snow, an adaptation of Peter Høeg's 1992 novel Miss Smilla's Feeling for Snow.
