= Qeqertaq =

Qeqertaq Øen
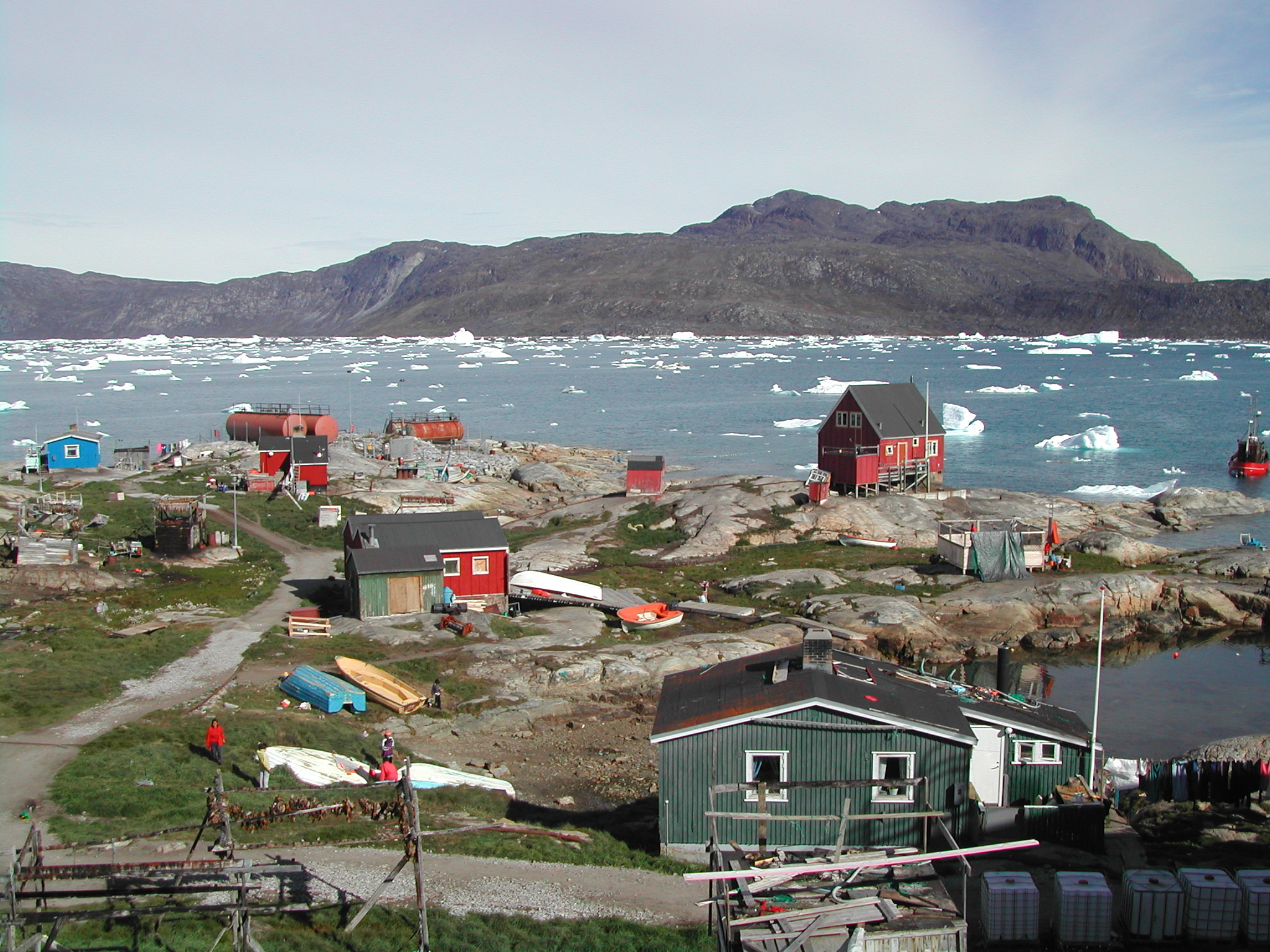
- Views over Qeqertaq.

- Location within Greenland
- Coordinates: 69°59′50″N 51°18′10″W
- State: Kingdom of Denmark
- Constituent country: Greenland
- Municipality: Avannaata
- Founded: 1830

Population (2024)
  - Total: 117
- Time zone: UTC−02:00 (Western Greenland Time)
  - Summer (DST): UTC−01:00 (Western Greenland Summer Time)
- Postal code: 3952 Ilulissat

Qeqertaq (pronounced: [qɜˈqɜtːɑq] (according to the old spelling K'eĸertaĸ)) is a settlement in the Avannaata municipality in western Greenland, located on an island off the southern shore of the Nuussuaq Peninsula in an inlet of Sullorsuaq Strait. Founded in 1830 as Øen, the settlement had 117 inhabitants in 2024.

== History ==
Archaeological finds of stone tools have been made in Qeqertaq, which suggest that the site was inhabited long before the colonial era. In 1793, a house with 21 residents was recorded. In 1799, a line-fishing venture was started on the island. Later, in 1805 the venture was abandoned, along with the island. After the Gunboat War ended in 1814, twelve people lived in Qeqertaq again. The number of inhabitants continued to increase and in 1825 there were already several houses in the village. Qeqertaq became a winter udsted, a small trading post where skins and lard were exchanged for European goods, around 1830, and in 1845 became a year-round udsted.

In 1915, Qeqertaq had 68 residents, including one Dane. The Greenlanders lived in eleven dwelling houses. The Danish udstedsbestyrer (trading post administrator) lived in a wooden house with two rooms and a kitchen. There was also an official udstedsbestyrer's apartment, which was built in 1878 as a half-timbered building with a turf wall façade and shingle roof, which had two rooms, a kitchen and a hall. The local store, from 1882, was a wood-panelled half-timbered house. The saltwork was built in 1911 and was made from materials from an old penthouse from the long-abandoned Alluttoq (Klokkerhuk) settlement. The school chapel was built in 1889 as a half-timbered building with a turf wall facade. In addition to the udstedsbestyrer, nine hunters, three fishermen, and a trained catechist worked in Qeqertaq.

From 1911 Qeqertaq was a separate municipality within the colonial district of Ritenbenk. It belonged to the 6th provincial constituency of North Greenland. It also included the settlements of Ikorfat, Nuugaaq, Akunnaaq, and Naajaat. Qeqertaq was part of the Ilulissat Parish and belonged to the Chief Catechists' District of Appat.

In 1928, Qeqertaq received a new school chapel. In 1932, a new udstedsbestyrer's residence was built. In 1942, a workhouse was built, and in 1945 a packing house. Between 1930 and 1950, Qeqertaq had between 72 and 103 residents. The population thereafter declined slightly. In 1952, the twelve local fishermen were unsuccessful and caught an average of no more than 147 kg of fish, so that for each ton of fish there was 47.57 m^{2} available in the fish house, while at the same time in Aappilattoq it was 0.41 m^{2}. In 1963 another warehouse was built, which originally stood in Ataa and now also served as a shop.

When Ritenbenk lost colonial status in 1942, the municipality of Qeqertaq became part of the colonial district of Jakobshavn (Iluissat). In 1950, the town was incorporated into the newly created municipality of Vaigat, but in 1963 it was transferred to the municipality of Ilulissat. In the 2009 administrative reform, Qeqertaq became a part of the Qaasuitsup municipality and in 2018 a part of the Avannaata municipality.

== Transport ==
=== Air ===
During winter, Air Greenland serves the village as part of government contract, with helicopter flights to Ilulissat.

=== Sea ===
During summer and autumn, when the waters of Disko Bay are navigable, communication between settlements is by sea only, serviced by Diskoline. The ferry links Qeqertaq with Ilulissat, Saqqaq, and Oqaatsut.

== Economy ==
The village's main source of income is fishing for halibut, where the purchased fish are processed at the local fish factory.

== Current Population ==
Approximately 16 students from 1st to 9th grade attend the local school, Iisaap Atuarfia. The church from 1992 has 80 seats. The population of Qeqertaq has slowly increased in the last two decades. As of 1 January 2024, Øen had 117 inhabitants.

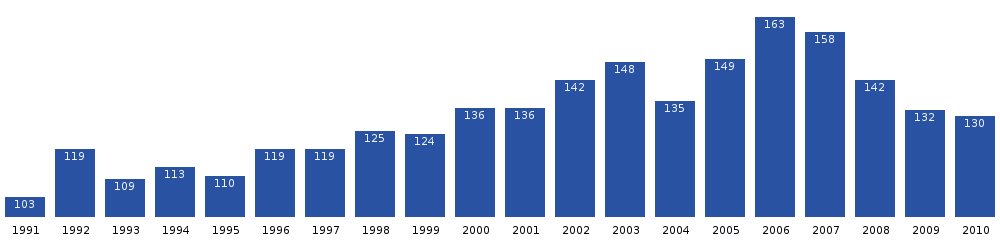
Qeqertaq population growth dynamics in the last two decades. Source: Statistics Greenland
