= Saqqaq Heliport =

Heliport in Greenland

- IATA: none; ICAO: BGSQ; LID: QUP

Summary
- Airport type: Public
- Operator: Greenland Airport Authority (Mittarfeqarfiit)
- Serves: Saqqaq, Greenland
- Elevation AMSL: 38 ft / 12 m
- Coordinates: 70°00′41″N 051°55′56″W
- Website: Saqqaq Heliport

Map
- Location in Greenland

Helipads
Number	Length		Surface
Number	m	ft	Surface
1	30 × 20	98 × 66	Gravel
- Source: Danish AIS

Saqqaq Heliport (ICAO: BGSQ) is a heliport in Saqqaq, a village on the Nuussuaq Peninsula in the Avannaata municipality in western Greenland. The heliport is considered a helistop, and is served by Air Greenland as part of a government contract.

== Airlines and destinations ==
Airlines	Destinations
Air Greenland (settlement flights)	Seasonal: Ilulissat
