= Alluttoq Island =

Island in Greenland

Native name: Arveprinsen Ejland
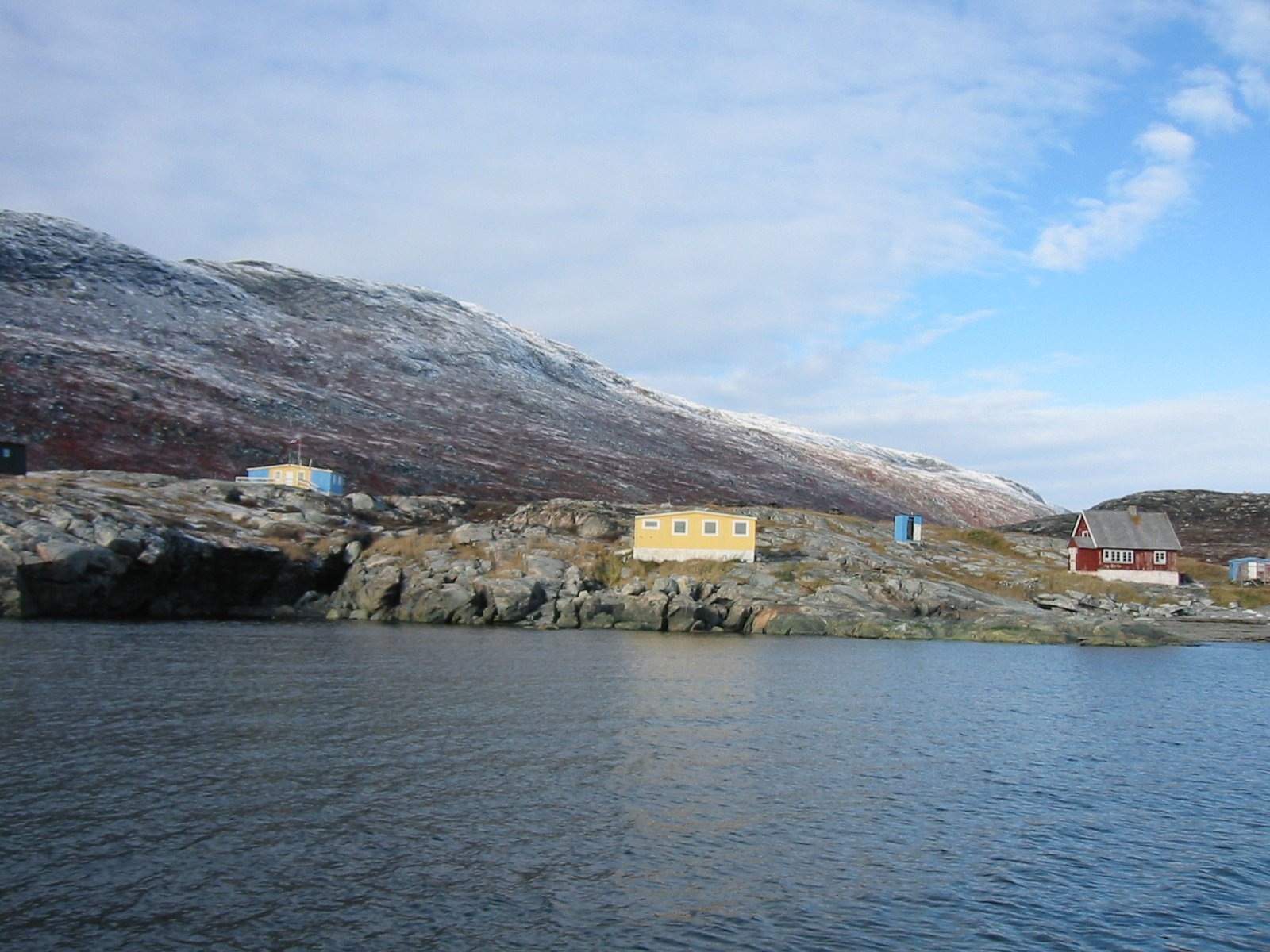
- Abandoned buildings in Ataa on the eastern coast

- Location of Alluttoq Island in Greenland
- Interactive map of Alluttoq Island

Geography
- Location: Baffin Bay
- Coordinates: 69°44′30″N 51°08′00″W
- Area: 626 km^{2} (242 sq mi)
- Area rank: 13th largest in Greenland

Administration
- Greenland
- Municipality: Avannaata
- Abandoned settlement: Ataa

Demographics
- Population: 0
- Pop. density: 0/km^{2} (0/sq mi)
- Ethnic groups: none

Alluttoq Island (Danish: Arveprinsen Ejland) is a large 655 km^{2} (252.9 mi^{2}), uninhabited island in Avannaata municipality in western Greenland, located in the northern part of Disko Bay, in the outlet of the Sullorsuaq Strait, east of Disko Island.

== Settlements ==
=== Prehistoric settlements ===
A few Paleo-Eskimo remnants are found throughout Alluttoq, including sites of Niaqornaq, Smallesund II, Appat, and Klokkerhuk. Archeological findings throughout the 20th century identified numerous flakes of killiaq possibly from both Thule and Saqqaq cultures. A late Dorset harpoon head was reportedly excavated from Ritenbenk, but it mismatched the findings of only artifacts of Innussuq Thule culture on the site.

=== Modern settlements ===
Ataa, located on the eastern coast of the island, is an abandoned settlement, with the last families leaving the village around 1960. Since then, Ataa acts as a wilderness camp and a tourist site. Meanwhile, the closest populated settlements are Qeqertaq to the northeast, on an island off the Nuussuaq Peninsula, and Oqaatsut to the southeast, on the mainland.

== History ==
Research indicates that megatsunamis generated by large landslides into Sullorsuaq Strait (known in Danish as Vaigat Strait) struck Alluttoq Island at least twice in prehistory. A wave that struck sometime around 5,650 BC had a run-up height of 41 to 66 metres (135 to 217 ft), and another that struck around 5,350 BC had a run-up height of 45 to 70 metres (148 to 230 ft).

Long et al. (1999) suggested that the western bank of Alluttoq was ice-free from 9,700 to 9,900 years BP. The same research suggested a sea level rise at Alluttoq at a rate of 2 millimetres (0.079 in) per year, amounting to an increase of 5 metres (16 ft) since 2,500 calibrated years BP.

== Ecology ==
Alluttoq has been identified of having a major Brünnich’s guillemot colony. This corresponds to a settlement of the guillemot to Qasigiannguit from April to June per ice conditions, with nesting grounds established at north of Disko Bay by June.

Alluttoq hosts a few Carex sedges, which was identified of hosting a few Anthracoidea smut fungi.

== See also ==
- List of islands of Greenland
