= Qaqqasunnarsuaq =

Mountain in Greenland

Qaqqasunnarsuaq is a mountain of Greenland. It is located in the Upernavik Archipelago. Unique in Greenland, Qeqertarsuaq's black sand beaches and volcanic rock formations offer unusual whale watching and hiking opportunities in Disko Bay.

Hikers, in particular, are drawn to the unusual geology and colourful landscapes around Qeqertarsuaq, which also offer views of the enormous icebergs and some of the best whale watching in Disko Bay.
