= Makka Kleist =

Greenlandic actress

- Born: December 25, 1951 (age 73); Qullissat, County of Greenland, Denmark
- Occupation: Actress
- Relatives: Kuupik Kleist (cousin)

Makka Kleist (born 1951) is a Greenlandic actress. After training to be a schoolteacher, she was inspired to become an actress and received training at the Tuukkaq Teater in western Jutland. As she was unable to find work in Denmark, she moved to Canada where she appeared in the TV series Daughter of the Country (1986). Back in Greenland, she met the theatre director Svenn Syrin who persuaded her to move to Tromsø in Norway where she appeared mainly at the youth theatre. In 2004, the couple moved to Greenland where Kleist became the leader of the amateur drama group Silamiut. From 2007 to 2016, she ran the newly established Greenlandic Drama School. In 2011, Kleist was awarded the Sermitsiaq Culture Prize.

== Early life and education ==
Born in Qullissat on Disko Island on 25 December 1951, Makka Kleist is the youngest daughter of Nikolaj Kleist and his wife Bertiaraq. She was one of the family's five children. Adopted by her parents, her cousin Kuupik Kleist has served as prime minister of Greenland. After first attending her local school in Greenland, when she was 12 Kleist was sent to a school Odsherred, Denmark, after which she returned to Greenland where she attended an efterskole in Aasiaat and a realskole in Nuuk.

She then returned to Denmark where she embarked on a teacher training course in Frederiksberg but returned to Greenland to qualify for her teaching diploma at the training college in Nuuk. After attending a performance by the Tuukkaq Theatre, she was reminded of her childhood dream of becoming an actress and decided to study drama at the Tuukkaq school in Jutland. Under the guidance of Reidar Nilsson, she spent a total of five years training and performing at the Tuukkaq.

== Career ==
Recognizing that opportunities for her to act in Denmark or Greenland were limited, Kleist decided to move to Toronto, Canada, where she gained success in performing an indigenous role in the television series Daughters of the Country (1986) and in the stage play Aria (1987). At her mother's request, she then returned to Greenland to care for her family. In order to make a living, she became a schoolteacher but participated in the newly established Silamiut drama group.

In 1989, while performing in Aari, she met Svenn B. Syrin who was theatre director in Tromsø, Norway. She moved with him to Norway when she became active in the theatre, in particular as director of the Trmsø Youth Theatre.

In 2004, together with Syrin, she returned to Nuuk where she became director of Silamiut. From 2007 to 2016, she ran the newly established Greenlandic Theatre School. In 2011, she was awarded the Sermitsiaq Culture Prize.
