= Saqqaq =

Saqqaq Solsiden
- Location within Greenland
- Coordinates: 70°00′35″N 51°56′45″W
- State: Kingdom of Denmark
- Constituent country: Greenland
- Municipality: Avannaata
- First Settled: 2000 B.C.E.
- Founded: 1755

Population (2020)
  - Total: 132
- Time zone: UTC−02:00 (Western Greenland Time)
  - Summer (DST): UTC−01:00 (Western Greenland Summer Time)
- Postal code: 3952 Ilulissat

Saqqaq (old spelling: Sarqaq) is a settlement in the Avannaata municipality in western Greenland. Founded in 1755 as Solsiden, Saqqaq had 132 inhabitants in 2020. The village's Kalaallisut name is a translation of the Danish meaning "Sunny Side", in reference to its position relative to Livets Top.

It is the site name for the Saqqaq culture.

== Geography ==
It is located in the southwestern part of the Nuussuaq Peninsula, on the northern shore of Sullorsuaq Strait (known in Danish as Vaigat Strait), northwest of Ilulissat. Immediately northeast of Saqqaq is the Livets Top mountain (1,150 metres (3,773 ft)).

== History ==
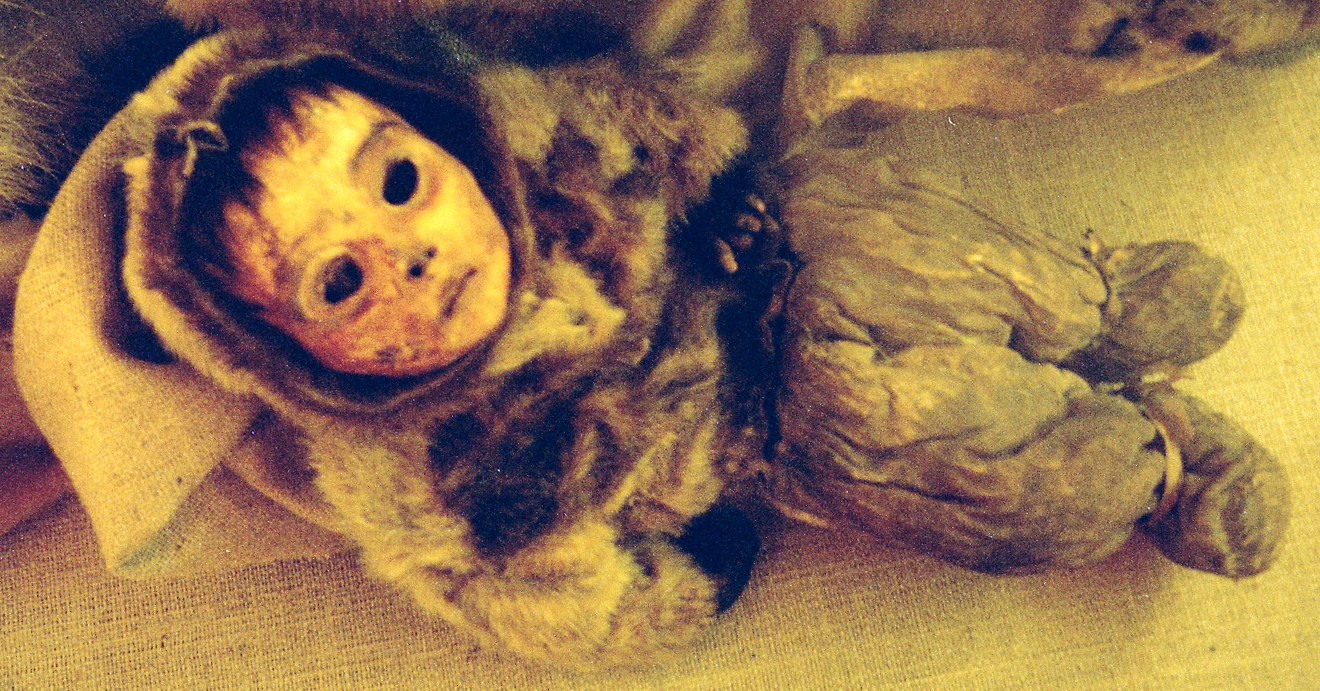
The mummy of a six-month-old boy found in Qilakitsoq

Archaeological excavations in Qilakitsoq on the other side of Nuussuaq Peninsula on the shores of Uummannaq Fjord revealed the existence of an ancient Arctic culture, later named the Saqqaq culture, which inhabited the area of west-central Greenland between 2500 BCE and 800 BCE.

Recent DNA samples from human hair suggest that the ancient Saqqaq people came from Siberia around 3,500 BCE and independent of the migration that gave rise to the modern Native Americans and the Inuit.

On 21 November 2000 a large landslide at Paatuut, 40 kilometres (22 nmi; 25 mi) from Saqqaq, generated a megatsunami in Sullorsuaq (or Vaigat) Strait. Energy from the tsunami refracted after it struck Disko Island across the strait, generating a wave with a run-up height of 3 metres (9.8 ft) which destroyed boats at Saqqaq.

== Transport ==
Air Greenland serves the village as part of government contract, with winter-only helicopter flights between Saqqaq Heliport and Ilulissat Airport. Settlement flights in the Disko Bay are unique in that they are operated only during winter and spring.

During summer and autumn, when the waters of the bay are navigable, communication between settlements is by sea only, serviced by Diskoline. The ferry links Saqqaq with Qeqertaq, Oqaatsut, and Ilulissat.

== Population ==
The population of Saqqaq has increased by 60 percent relative to the 1990 levels, stabilizing in the following decade. Saqqaq is one of the very few demographically stable settlements in the Disko Bay region.

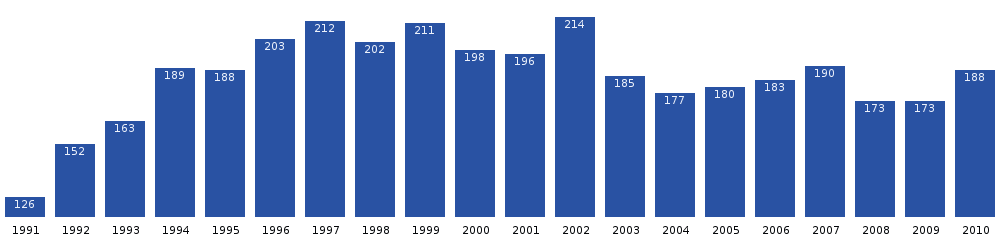

Population chart
Year	1991	1992	1993	1994	1995	1996	1997	1998	1999	2000	2001	2002	2003	2004	2005	2006	2007	2008	2009	2010
Pop.	126	152	163	189	188	203	212	202	211	198	196	214	185	177	180	183	190	173	173	188
±%	—	+20.6%	+7.2%	+16.0%	−0.5%	+8.0%	+4.4%	−4.7%	+4.5%	−6.2%	−1.0%	+9.2%	−13.6%	−4.3%	+1.7%	+1.7%	+3.8%	−8.9%	+0.0%	+8.7%

Saqqaq population growth dynamics from 1991-2010. Source: Statistics Greenland
