= Nuussuaq Peninsula =

Peninsula in western Greenland

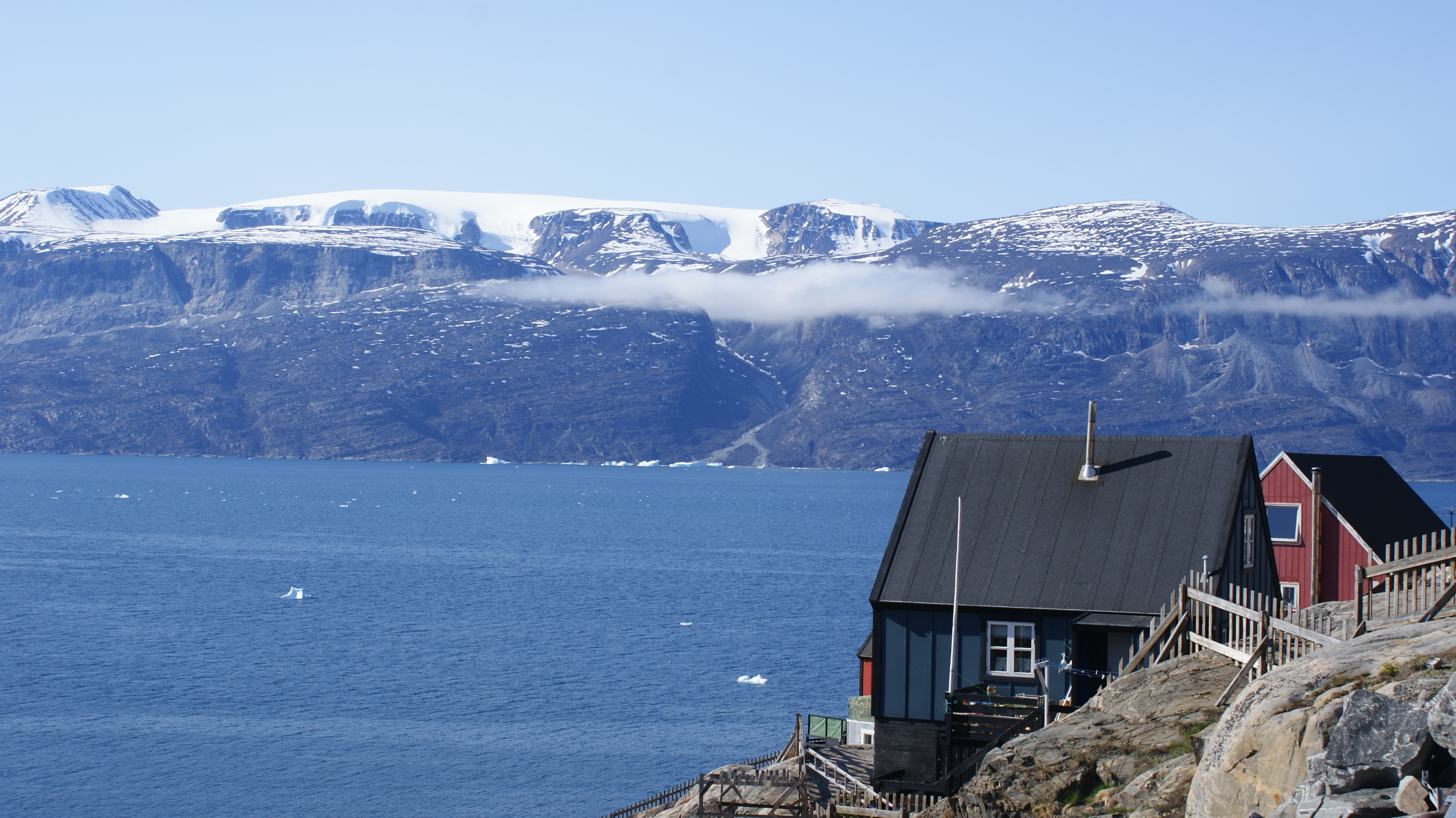
- Nuussuaq Peninsula seen from Uummannaq

- Location within Greenland
- Interactive map of Nuussuaq Peninsula

Geography
- Location: Baffin Bay
- Coordinates: 70°25′N 52°30′W
- Area: 7,160 km^{2} (2,760 sq mi)
- Length: 180 km (112 mi)
- Width: 48 km (29.8 mi)
- Highest elevation: 2,144 m (7034 ft)

Administration
- Greenland
- Municipality: Avannaata

Nuussuaq Peninsula (Greenlandic pronunciation: [nuːsːuɑq], old spelling: Nûgssuaq) is a large (180 by 48 kilometres (112 mi × 30 mi)) peninsula in western Greenland.

== Geography ==
The waters around the peninsula are that of Baffin Bay. To the south and southwest the peninsula is bounded by Disko Bay, an inlet of Baffin Bay. It is separated from Qeqertarsuaq Island by Sullorsuaq Strait, known in Danish as Vaigat Strait, which connects Disko Bay with Baffin Bay. To the northeast, it is bounded by the Uummannaq Fjord system.

The peninsula is mountainous, with the highest summit reaching 2,144 metres (7,034 ft). The spinal range splits in two to the northwest of the base of the peninsula, with the southern arm forming the coastal range, the central arm almost entirely glaciated, and continuing northwest the entire length of the peninsula. The two arms are dissected by a deep Kuussuaq Valley, partially filled in the center with Sarqap Tassersuaq, a glacial, emerald lake.

=== Climate ===
The entire Nuussuaq Peninsula experiences a tundra climate (Köppen: ET); with short, quite cool summers and long, frigid winters.

Eastern settlements such as Uummannaq and Qaarsut are sheltered from the coastal winds by the high, glaciated Qilertinnguit mountain. Consequently, occasional strong foehn winds from the southeast can occur, raising the temperature above freezing even in winter. Moreover, this causes the area to be considered as the sunniest spot in Greenland. Climate data below was collated from 2000 to 2020 at Qaarsut Airport, representative of leeward locations.

Climate data for Qaarsut Airport (70.73°N 52.68°W) (88 m (289 ft) AMSL) (2000-2020 data)
Month	Jan	Feb	Mar	Apr	May	Jun	Jul	Aug	Sep	Oct	Nov	Dec	Year
Record high °C (°F)	8.0 (46.4)	9.2 (48.6)	9.6 (49.3)	14.4 (57.9)	18.2 (64.8)	18.7 (65.7)	21.4 (70.5)	20.6 (69.1)	16.4 (61.5)	14.0 (57.2)	9.7 (49.5)	11.2 (52.2)	21.4 (70.5)
Mean daily maximum °C (°F)	−8.9 (16.0)	−11.2 (11.8)	−10.6 (12.9)	−4.7 (23.5)	2.7 (36.9)	9.0 (48.2)	12.2 (54.0)	10.6 (51.1)	4.8 (40.6)	−0.3 (31.5)	−4.4 (24.1)	−6.8 (19.8)	−0.6 (30.9)
Daily mean °C (°F)	−11.6 (11.1)	−14.3 (6.3)	−14.3 (6.3)	−8.6 (16.5)	−0.4 (31.3)	5.8 (42.4)	9.1 (48.4)	7.7 (45.9)	2.5 (36.5)	−2.5 (27.5)	−6.8 (19.8)	−9.1 (15.6)	−3.5 (25.7)
Mean daily minimum °C (°F)	−14.3 (6.3)	−17.4 (0.7)	−17.6 (0.3)	−12.4 (9.7)	−3.3 (26.1)	2.9 (37.2)	6.0 (42.8)	4.7 (40.5)	0.0 (32.0)	−4.8 (23.4)	−9.1 (15.6)	−11.6 (11.1)	−6.4 (20.5)
Record low °C (°F)	−30.3 (−22.5)	−31.9 (−25.4)	−33.9 (−29.0)	−27.7 (−17.9)	−16.2 (2.8)	−4.3 (24.3)	−1.1 (30.0)	−0.9 (30.4)	−9.6 (14.7)	−14.0 (6.8)	−18.8 (−1.8)	−27.4 (−17.3)	−33.9 (−29.0)
Average precipitation mm (inches)	16 (0.6)	16 (0.6)	17 (0.7)	17 (0.7)	16 (0.6)	22 (0.9)	28 (1.1)	28 (1.1)	36 (1.4)	28 (1.1)	33 (1.3)	25 (1.0)	280 (11.0)
Average precipitation days (≥ 0.1 mm)	10	9	10	10	8	7	8	9	11	11	14	12	118
Average relative humidity (%)	63.0	64.6	66.3	67.8	75.0	75.2	71.6	69.6	67.1	63.1	62.4	62.0	67.3
Source 1: Danish Meteorological Institute (1981-2020 data)
Source 2: Climates To Travel

The Nuusuaq weather station has operated since 1991. It showcases the climate on the peninsula's west coast. Due to its exposed position next to the Baffin Bay, it has a lower seasonal temperature range, smaller diurnal temperature variation greater seasonal lag and higher relative humidity compared with the Qaarsut Airport station.

Climate data for Nuusuaq (70.65°N 54.60°W) (27 m (89 ft) AMSL) (2000-2020 data)
Month	Jan	Feb	Mar	Apr	May	Jun	Jul	Aug	Sep	Oct	Nov	Dec	Year
Record high °C (°F)	7.7 (45.9)	7.8 (46.0)	8.8 (47.8)	12.6 (54.7)	13.0 (55.4)	18.7 (65.7)	17.5 (63.5)	15.7 (60.3)	15.9 (60.6)	12.9 (55.2)	13.3 (55.9)	10.1 (50.2)	18.7 (65.7)
Mean daily maximum °C (°F)	−9.9 (14.2)	−12.9 (8.8)	−13.2 (8.2)	−6.5 (20.3)	−0.2 (31.6)	5.0 (41.0)	7.7 (45.9)	7.1 (44.8)	4.1 (39.4)	0.0 (32.0)	−3.5 (25.7)	−6.1 (21.0)	−2.4 (27.7)
Daily mean °C (°F)	−12.0 (10.4)	−15.2 (4.6)	−15.5 (4.1)	−8.8 (16.2)	−1.9 (28.6)	3.0 (37.4)	5.7 (42.3)	5.5 (41.9)	2.7 (36.9)	−1.4 (29.5)	−5.2 (22.6)	−7.8 (18.0)	−4.2 (24.4)
Mean daily minimum °C (°F)	−14.0 (6.8)	−17.3 (0.9)	−18.0 (−0.4)	−11.2 (11.8)	−3.7 (25.3)	1.1 (34.0)	3.8 (38.8)	3.8 (38.8)	1.4 (34.5)	−2.6 (27.3)	−6.5 (20.3)	−9.5 (14.9)	−6.1 (21.0)
Record low °C (°F)	−30.6 (−23.1)	−34.8 (−30.6)	−36.1 (−33.0)	−30.8 (−23.4)	−17.4 (0.7)	−5.0 (23.0)	−2.3 (27.9)	−7.2 (19.0)	−5.4 (22.3)	−10.3 (13.5)	−17.9 (−0.2)	−25.7 (−14.3)	−36.1 (−33.0)
Average relative humidity (%)	68.3	70.9	73.1	73.2	81.4	87.0	86.2	83.0	76.0	67.3	63.9	65.5	74.6
Source: Danish Meteorological Institute (1981-2020 data)

== Settlements ==
The peninsula is administered as part of the Avannaata municipality. The main settlements are Qaarsut and Niaqornat on the northwestern shore, Saqqaq on the southeastern shore, at the foot of the Livets Top mountain (1,150 metres (3,773 ft)), and Qeqertaq on a small island just off the southern shore, at the base of the peninsula.

== History ==
Archaeological excavations in Qilakitsoq on the southwestern shore revealed the existence of an ancient Arctic culture later named the Saqqaq culture that inhabited the area of west-central Greenland between 2500 BCE and 800 BCE.

The world's largest fossil mollusk, Inoceramus steenstrup, was found in 1952 in Qilakitsoq Valley on the peninsula.

Major landslides have occurred along the southern coast of the peninsula since prehistoric times, sometimes generating tsunamis or megatsunamis in Sullorsuaq Strait:

- Research indicates that nine large tsunamigenic landslides struck Sullorsuaq Strait in prehistoric times during the Holocene, seven of them from the southern coast of the Nuussuaq Peninsula and two others from the northern coast of Disko Island across the strait from the peninsula. Seven of the landslides apparently occurred between about 8020 BC and 6520 BC with unidentified tsunamigenic effects. The two most recent prehistoric landslides generated megatsunamis which struck Alluttoq Island, the first sometime around 5650 BC with a run-up height of 41 to 66 metres (135 to 217 ft), and another that struck around 5350 BC with a run-up height of 45 to 70 metres (148 to 230 ft).
- On 15 December 1952, an 80-metre (262 ft) thick landslide began at a height of 500 to 700 metres (1,640 to 2,297 ft) on a slope of the mountain Niiortuut (70.349°N 053.178°W) and traveled 2,750 metres (3,007 yd). Between 1,800,000 and 4,500,000 cubic metres (2,400,000 and 5,900,000 cu yd) of material entered Sullorsuaq Strait, creating 4.7 hectares (12 acres) of new land extending 90 metres (295 ft) into the strait and generating a tsunami. With a run-up height of 4.5 to 7.7 metres (15 to 25 ft), it struck a group of four fishermen 10 kilometres (6.2 mi) away on the southern coast of the Nuussuaq Peninsula, killing one of them. Then it struck the town of Qullissat 30 kilometres (19 mi) away across the strait on Disko Island, where it had a run-up height of 2.2 to 2.7 metres (7 ft 3 in to 8 ft 10 in).
- On 21 November 2020, a 90,000,000-cubic-metre (120,000,000 cu yd) landslide with a mass of 260,000,000 tons fell from an elevation of 1,000 to 1,400 metres (3,300 to 4,600 ft) at Paatuut, reaching a speed of 140 kilometres per hour (87 mph). About 30,000,000 cubic metres (39,000,000 cu yd) of material with a mass of 87,000,000 tons entered Sullorsuaq Strait, generating a megatsunami. The wave had a run-up height of 50 metres (164 ft) near the landslide and 28 metres (92 ft) at the former site of Qullissat, 20 kilometres (11 nmi; 12 mi) away, where it inundated the coast as far as 100 metres (328 ft) inland. Refracted energy from the tsunami created a wave with a run-up height of 3 metres (9.8 ft) that destroyed boats at Saqqaq, 40 kilometres (25 mi) from the landslide.
- An unwitnessed landslide from an elevation of 600 to 880 metres (2,000 to 2,900 ft) consisting of 18,300,000 to 25,900,000 cubic metres (23,900,000 to 33,900,000 cu yd) of frozen debris and rock occurred at Assapaat (70°19′09″N 052°59′48″W) on 13 June 2021. About 3,900,000 cubic metres (5,100,000 cu yd) of material entered Sullorsuaq Strait but apparently did not generate a tsunami.

== Photographs ==
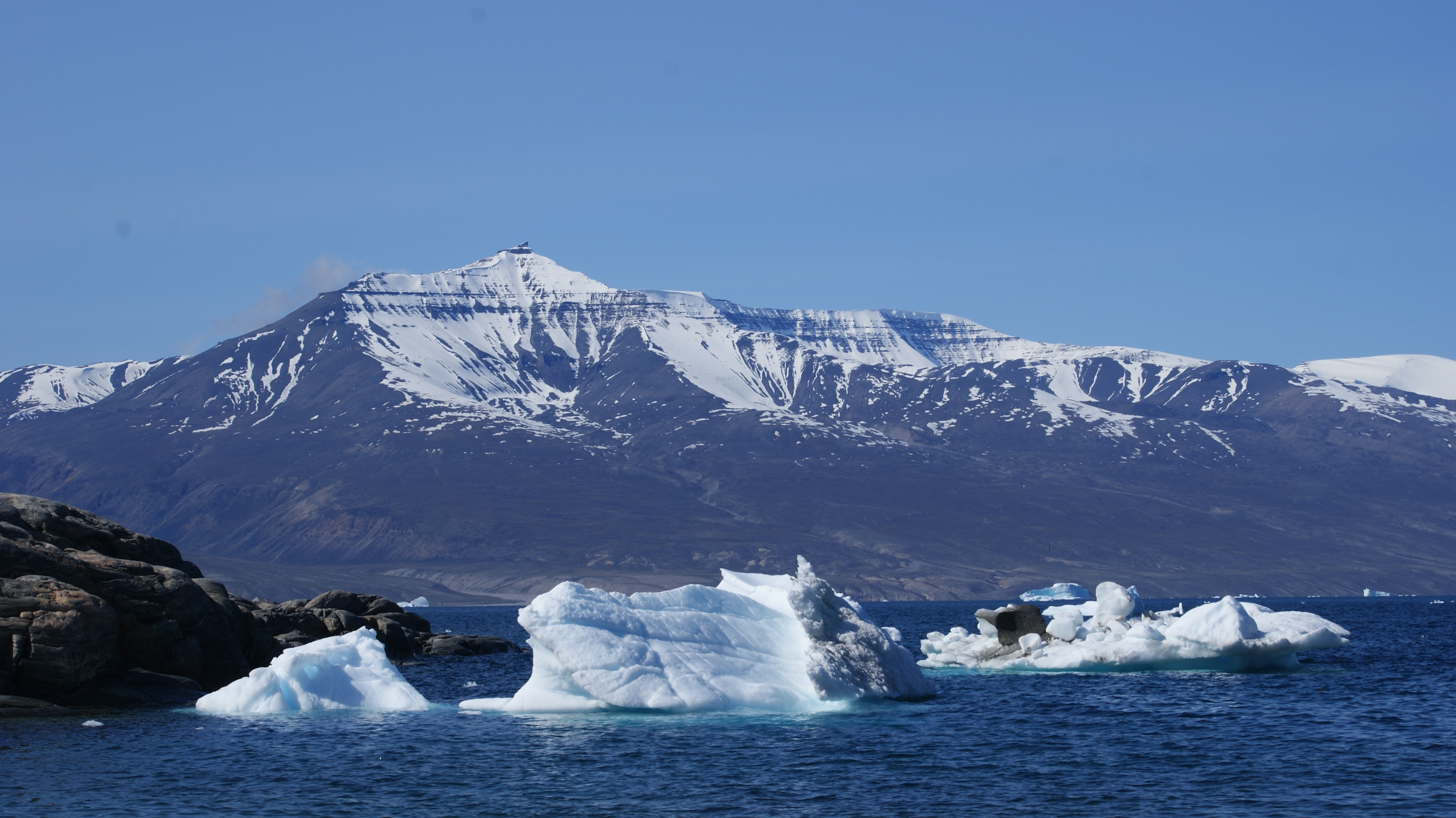
Qilertiinguit Kangilequtaa (2,070 m (6,791 ft)) seen from Uummannaq across the main arm of Uummannaq Fjord

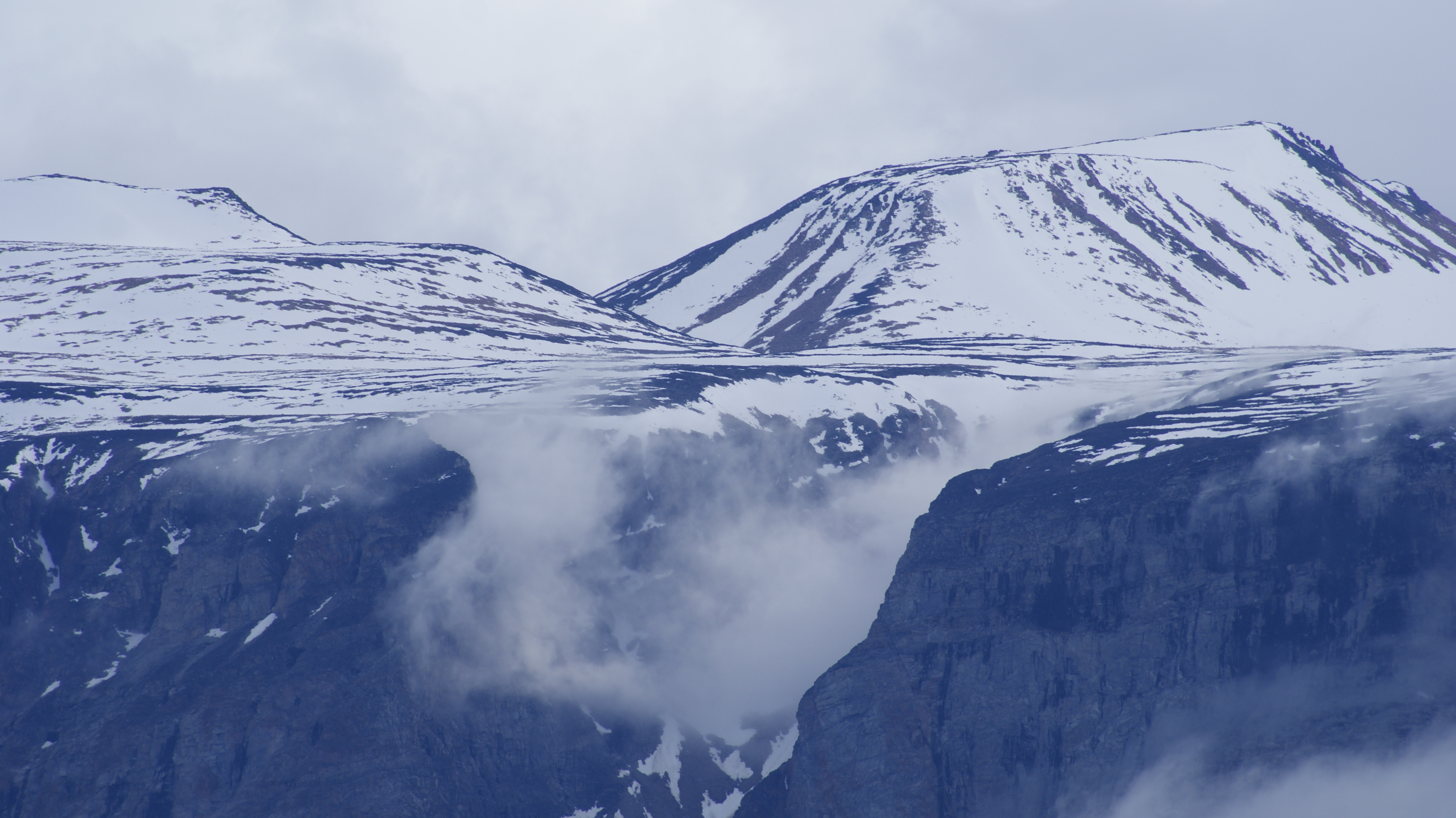
Chasm couloir above the northeastern shore. Seen from Uummannaq.

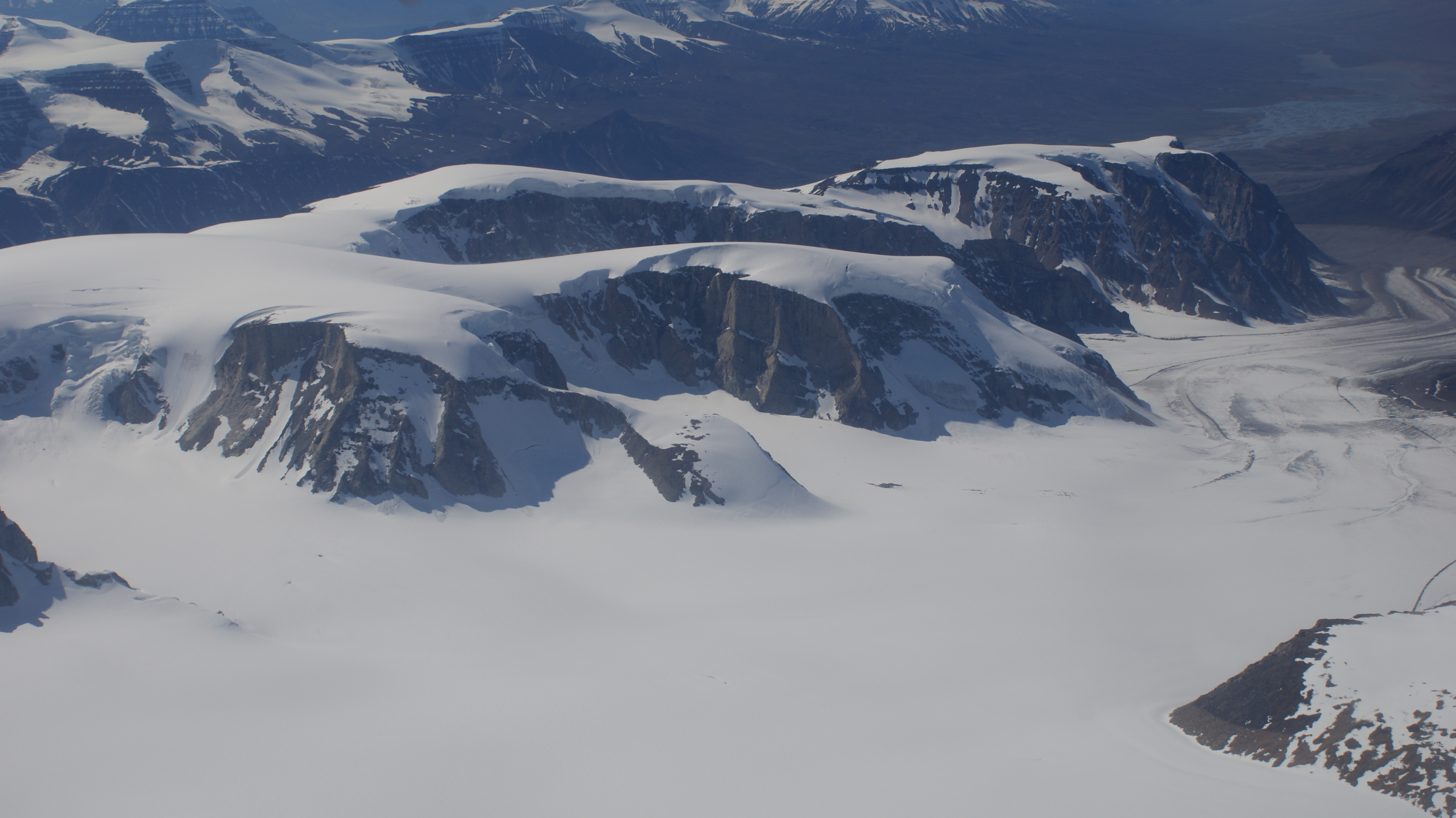
Aerial view: Nunavik and the blanket glacier covering a large part of the northern chain of the central mountain range, north of Auvarrssuaq valley.

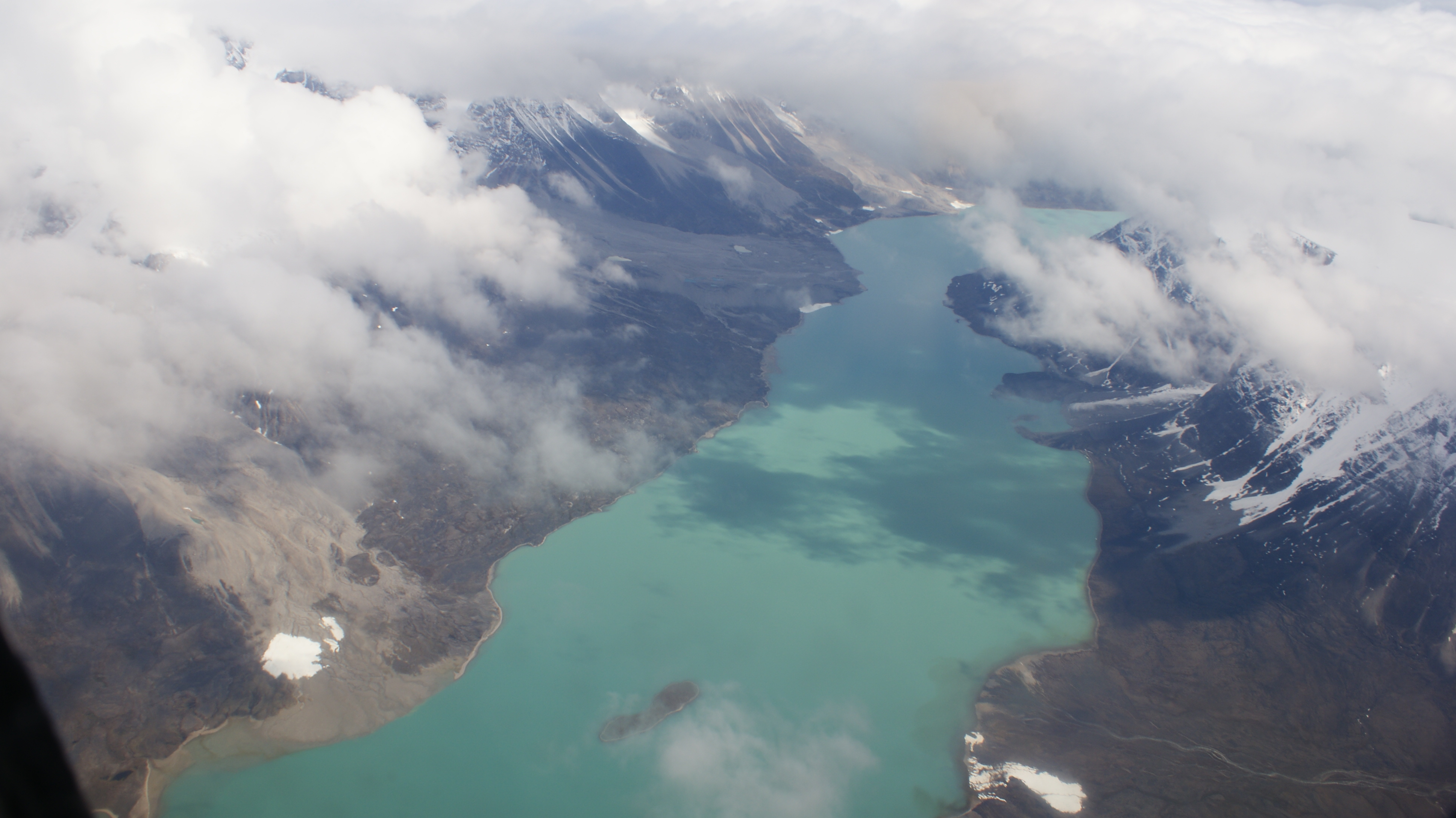
Aerial view of Sarqap Tassersuaq, the emerald lake in the central valley
