= QUP =

QUP or qup may refer to:

- Queensland United Party, a defunct political party in Queensland, Australia
- QUP, the FAA LID code for Saqqaq Heliport, Greenland
- qup, the ISO 639-3 code for Southern Pastaza Quechua, Ecuador
