= Qullissat =

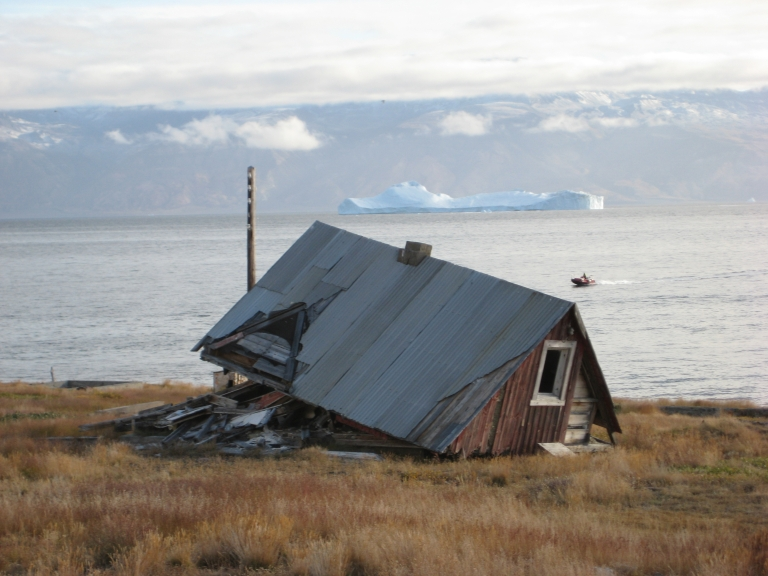
- A house in 2008, 36 years after the settlement was abandoned. The house was damaged by the 2000 tsunami.

- Location within Greenland
- Coordinates: 70°05′04″N 53°00′35″W
- State: Kingdom of Denmark
- Constituent country: Greenland
- Municipality: Qeqertalik
- Founded: 1924
- Abandoned: 1972
- Time zone: UTC-03

Qullissat (old spelling: Qutdligssat) is a former settlement in the Qeqertalik municipality, located on the northeast coast of Disko Island on the west coast of Greenland. It was a coal mining town founded to exploit the natural resources of Disko Island. The mines operated for 48 years until 1972, when the economic base of the settlement collapsed, leading to its abandonment.

== Geography ==
Qulissat was located on the northeastern coast of Disko Island (Greenlandic: Qeqertarsuaq) on the shores of Sullorsuaq Strait (known in Danish as Vaigat Strait), facing the Nuussuaq Peninsula, which lies on the other side of the 20-kilometre (11 nmi; 12 mi) wide strait.

== History ==
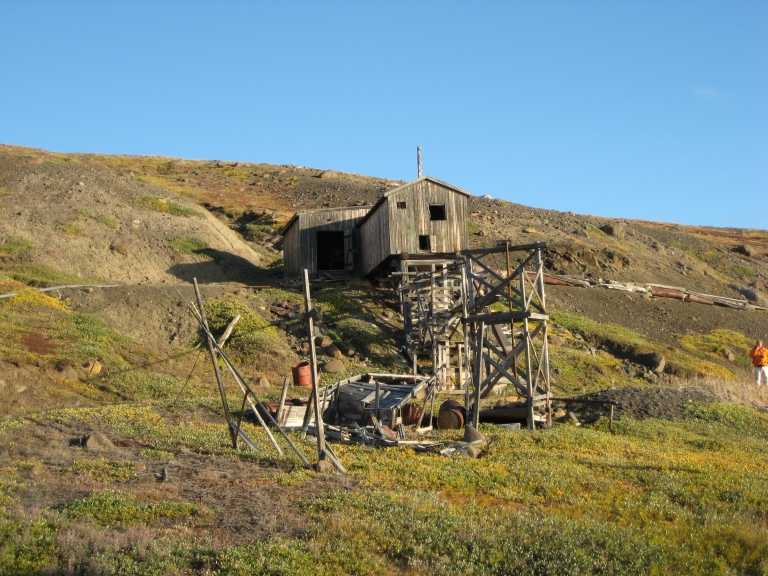
Old waterworks

Qullissat was not a traditional Inuit settlement, but was founded in 1924 as a coal mining town. By 1952, it had a population of 995, making it Greenland's third-largest settlement, and had become a cultural hub.

On 15 December 1952, a landslide with a volume of 5,900,000 cubic metres (7,700,000 cu yd) on the slope of the mountain Niiortuut 30 kilometres (19 mi) from Qullissat generated a tsunami in Sullorsuaq (or Vaigat) Strait. The wave struck a group of four fishermen 10 kilometres (6.2 mi) away on the southern coast of the Nuussuaq Peninsula, killing one of them, then struck Qullissat, where it had a run-up height of 2.2 to 2.7 metres (7 ft 3 in to 8 ft 10 in) and inflicted minor damage.

In 1960 Nanok Idraetslag, a football team from Qullissat, were crowned champions of the 1959–60 Greenlandic Football Championship.

By 1966 the mine was producing 40,000 tonnes (39,000 long tons; 44,000 short tons) of coal a year and the town had a population of 1,400, making it the sixth-largest population centre in Greenland. The coal mine attracted a multinational population, with Danes, Swedes, and British people working in the mines.

The Greenland Provincial Council voted to close the mine in 1966 due to falling profits and demand, the poor quality of the coal, and the need for a larger labour force in the cod fishing industry. Residents were to be moved after a relocation plan was completed. The mine was eventually closed on 4 October 1972, despite the fact that the cod industry had collapsed in the interim. By then 700 residents had already moved, and the remaining 500 were compulsorily relocated. Kuupik Kleist, later Prime Minister of Greenland, was born in Qullissat in 1958 and was the last person to be confirmed there before the settlement was abandoned in 1972.

The town was sold on 20 October 1972 to an entrepreneur, who demolished the site. The town's church was spared and relocated to nearby Ilulissat.

On 21 November 2000 a large landslide at Paatuut, 20 kilometres (11 nmi; 12 mi) away across Sullorsuaq (or Vaigat) Strait on the Nuussuaq Peninsula, generated a tsunami which hit the former site of Qullissat. The tsunami had a run-up height of 28 metres (92 ft) and reached more than 100 metres (328 ft) inland. It would have cost many lives had the town still been inhabited.

== In popular culture ==
The Greenlandic rock band Sumé made the mining town's demise the topic of a song called "Qullissat" on their 1974 album Inuit Nunaat.

== Notable residents ==
- Aka Hoegh (born 1947), Greenlandic artist
- Kuupik Kleist (born 1958), former Prime Minister of Greenland (2009-2013)
- Makka Kleist (born 1951), Greenlandic actress
