= Sullorsuaq Strait =

Strait in Greenland

Location within Greenland

Sullorsuaq Strait (old spelling: Suvdlorssuaq, Danish: Vaigat) is a strait on the western coast of Greenland.

== Geography ==
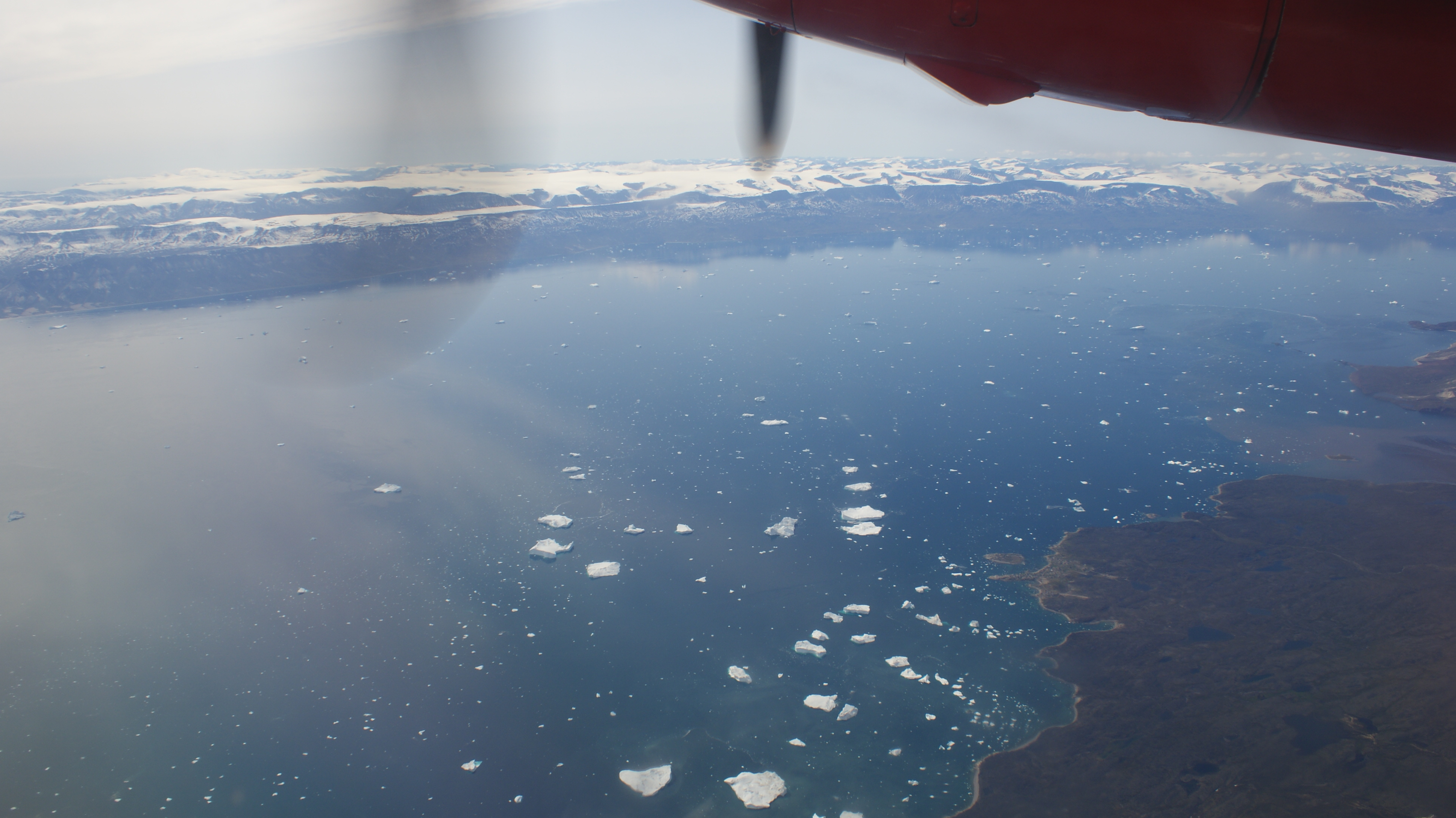
Sullorsuaq Strait looking from the northeast with Nuussuaq Peninsula shoreline on the foreground and Qeqertarsuaq Island on the horizon.

The strait separates Nuussuaq Peninsula in the northeast from Qeqertarsuaq Island in the southwest. The strait waterway connects inner Disko Bay in the southeast with Baffin Bay in the northwest. Qeqertarsuatsiaq Island is located in the northeastern mouth of the strait, where it opens into Baffin Bay. At the southeastern end, the large Alluttoq Island is located in the outlet of the strait, at the confluence with Disko Bay.

== Settlement ==
Saqqaq is the only settlement in the area, located in the southern part on the shores of Nuussuaq Peninsula. The former coal mining settlement of Qullissat, founded in 1924, was located on the northeast coast of Disko Island and grew into one of Greenland's larger settlements. Qullissat was abandoned in 1972, and the entire northern coast of Disko Island is now uninhabited.

== History ==
Archaeological excavations in Qilakitsoq on the northeastern shore revealed the existence of an ancient Arctic culture later named the Saqqaq culture, which is the archaeological designation of the earliest Palaeo-Eskimo culture of west and southeast part of Greenland. The natives inhabited the area of west-central Greenland between 2500 BCE and 800 BCE.

Major landslides have struck Sullorsuaq Strait since prehistoric times, sometimes generating tsunamis or megatsunamis:

- Research indicates that nine large tsunamigenic landslides struck the strait in prehistoric times during the Holocene, seven of them from the southern coast of the Nuussuaq Peninsula and two from the northern coast of Disko Island. Seven of the landslides apparently occurred between about 8,020 BC and 6,520 BC with unidentified tsunamigenic effects. The two most recent prehistoric landslides generated megatsunamis which struck Alluttoq Island, the first sometime around 5,650 BC with a run-up height of 41 to 66 metres (135 to 217 ft), and another that struck around 5,350 BC with a run-up height of 45 to 70 metres (148 to 230 ft).
- On 15 December 1952, an 80-metre (262 ft) thick landslide began at a height of 500 to 700 metres (1,640 to 2,297 ft) on a slope of the mountain Niiortuut (70.349°N 053.178°W) on the southern coast of the Nuussuaq Peninsula and traveled 2,750 metres (3,007 yd). Between 1,800,000 and 4,500,000 cubic metres (2,400,000 and 5,900,000 cu yd) of material entered the strait, creating 4.7 hectares (12 acres) of new land extending 90 metres (295 ft) into the strait and generating a tsunami. With a run-up height of 4.5 to 7.7 metres (15 to 25 ft), the wave struck a group of four fishermen 10 kilometres (6.2 mi) away on the southern coast of the Nuussuaq Peninsula, killing one of them. Then it struck the town of Qullissat 30 kilometres (19 mi) away on Disko Island, where it had a run-up height of 2.2 to 2.7 metres (7 ft 3 in to 8 ft 10 in).
- On 21 November 2020, a 90,000,000-cubic-metre (120,000,000 cu yd) landslide with a mass of 260,000,000 tons fell from an elevation of 1,000 to 1,400 metres (3,300 to 4,600 ft) at Paatuut on the southern coast of the Nuussuaq Peninsula, reaching a speed of 140 kilometres per hour (87 mph). About 30,000,000 cubic metres (39,000,000 cu yd) of material with a mass of 87,000,000 tons entered the strait, generating a megatsunami. The wave had a run-up height of 50 metres (164 ft) near the landslide and 28 metres (92 ft) at the former site of Qullissat, 20 kilometres (11 nmi; 12 mi) away, where it inundated the coast as far as 100 metres (328 ft) inland. Refracted energy from the tsunami created a wave with a run-up height of 3 metres (9.8 ft) that destroyed boats at Saqqaq, 40 kilometres (25 mi) from the landslide.
- An unwitnessed landslide from an elevation of 600 to 880 metres (2,000 to 2,900 ft) consisting of 18,300,000 to 25,900,000 cubic metres (23,900,000 to 33,900,000 cu yd) of frozen debris and rock occurred at Assapaat (70°19′09″N 052°59′48″W) on the southern coast of the Nuussuaq Peninsula on 13 June 2021. About 3,900,000 cubic metres (5,100,000 cu yd) of material entered the strait but did not generate a tsunami.

== See also ==
- Thule people
