= Saqqaq culture =

Ancient people of Southern Greenland

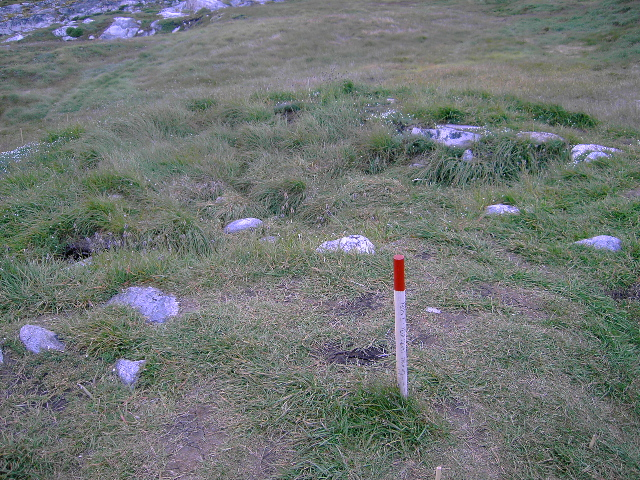
- Archaeological remains of the Saqqaq culture in Sermermiut, Disko Bay, West Greenland coast.
- Geographical range: Southern Greenland
- Period: Paleo-Inuit
- Dates: 2500 BCE – c. 800 BCE
- Followed by: Dorset culture

The Saqqaq culture was a Paleo-Inuit culture in southern Greenland. It was named after the settlement of Saqqaq, the site of many archaeological finds. The Saqqaq were the longest-residing culture of Greenland in all history.

== Timeframe ==
The earliest known archaeological culture in southern Greenland, the Saqqaq existed from around 2500 BCE until about 800 BCE. This culture coexisted with the Independence I culture of northern Greenland, which developed around 2400 BCE and lasted until about 1300 BCE. After the Saqqaq culture disappeared, the Independence II culture of northern Greenland and the Early Dorset culture of West Greenland emerged. There is some debate about the timeframe of the transition from Saqqaq culture to Early Dorset in western Greenland.

The Saqqaq culture came in two phases, the main difference between the two being that the newer phase adopted the use of sandstone. The younger phase of the Saqqaq culture coincides with the oldest phase of the Dorset culture.

== Archaeological findings ==
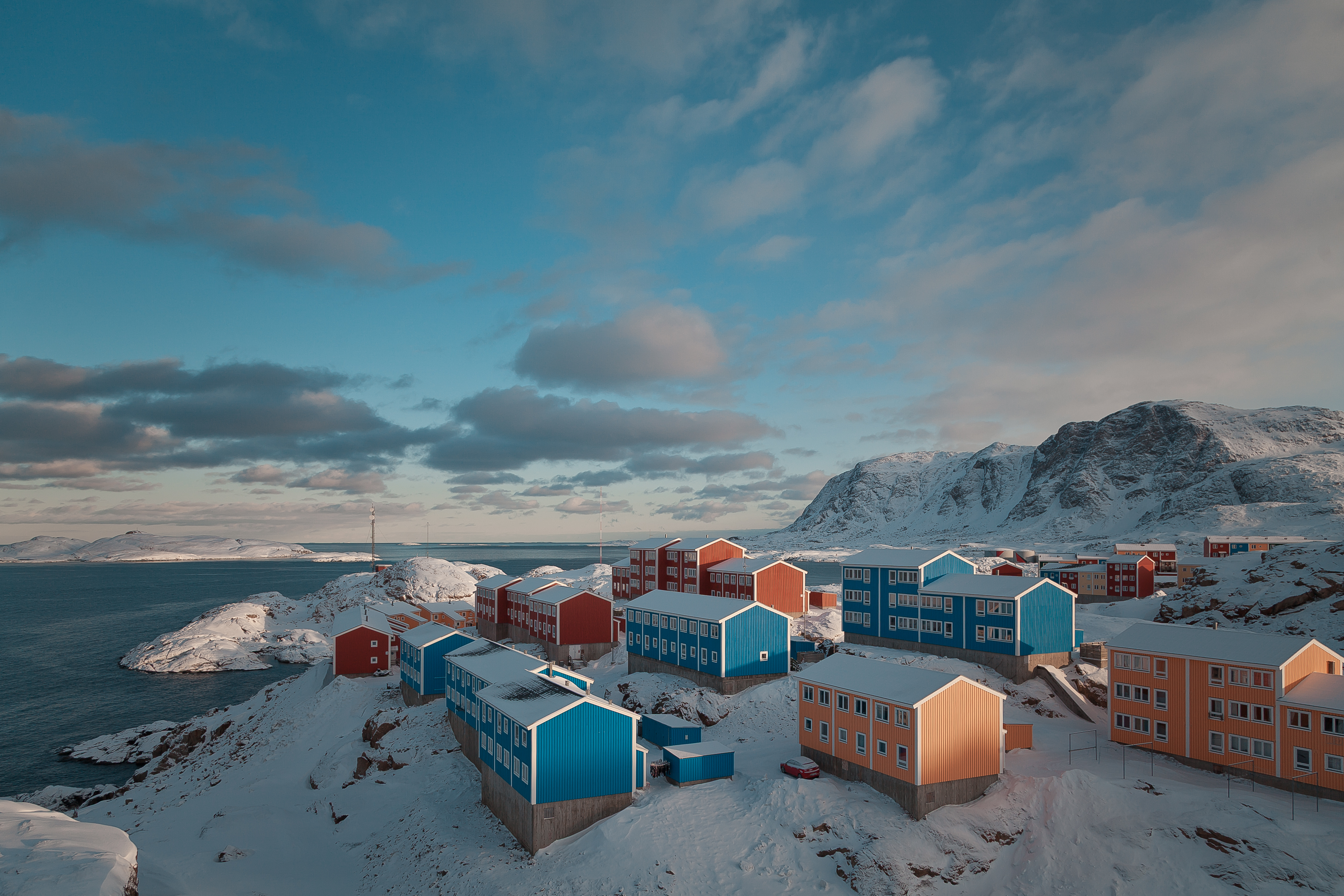
View of Sisimiut from Qiviarfik, with the mountain in the background; the area is rich in archaeological remains of the Saqqaq culture.

Frozen remains of a Saqqaq person dubbed "Inuk" were found on Disko Island in western Greenland at Qeqertarsuaq and have been DNA sequenced. He had brown eyes, black hair and shovel-shaped incisors. It has been determined that he lived about 4000 years ago and was related to indigenous populations in northeastern Siberia. The Saqqaq are not the ancestors of contemporary Kalaallit; their closest relatives are the modern Chukchis and Koryaks. It is not known whether they crossed in boats or over ice.

The Saqqaq people lived in small tents and hunted seals, seabirds and other marine animals. They used silicified slate, agate, quartzite and rock crystal as materials for their tools.

== Genetics ==
A genetic study published in Science in August 2014 examined the remains of six Saqqaq individuals buried in Qeqertasussuk, Greenland, between c. 3000 BCE and 1900 BCE. The five samples of mitochondrial DNA (mtDNA) extracted belonged to haplogroups D2a1 (four samples) and D2a. These haplogroups also predominate in the Dorset culture and are today found in high frequencies among the Siberian Yupik and Aleuts, to whom the Saqqaq are relatively closely related. The evidence suggested that the ancestors of the Saqqaq entered North America from Siberia through a distinct migration about 4000 BC, and that they subsequently remained largely genetically isolated from other North American populations.

== See also ==
- Thule people
- Qilakitsoq

== Sources ==
- Mobjerg, Tinna (February 1999). "New Adaptive Strategies in the Saqqaq Culture of Greenland, c. 1600-1400 BC". World Archaeology. 30 (3). Taylor & Francis: 452–465. doi:10.1080/00438243.1999.9980423. JSTOR 124963.
- Raghavan, Maanasa; DeGiorgio, Michael; Albrechtsen, Anders; et al. (29 August 2014). "The genetic prehistory of the New World Arctic" (PDF). Science. 345 (6200). doi:10.1126/science.1255832. PMID 25170159. S2CID 353853.
