= Disko Island =

Island in Baffin Bay, Greenland

Native name: Qeqertarsuaq
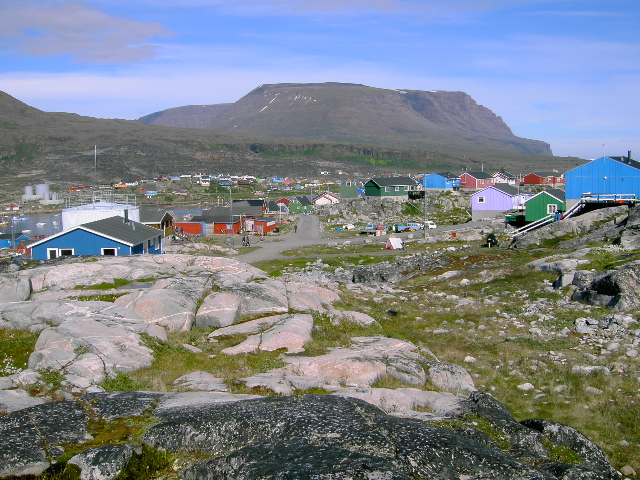
- Qeqertarsuaq town on Disko Island

- Location of Disko Island in Greenland
- Interactive map of Disko Island

Geography
- Location: Baffin Bay
- Coordinates: 69°45′N 53°30′W
- Area: 8,578 km^{2} (3,312 sq mi)
- Area rank: 84th largest in world 2nd largest in Greenland
- Length: 160 km (99 mi)
- Highest elevation: 1,919 m (6296 ft)
- Highest point: Pyramiden

Administration
- Greenland
- Municipality: Qeqertalik
- Largest settlement: Qeqertarsuaq (pop. 839)

Demographics
- Population: 1,100
- Pop. density: 0.13/km^{2} (0.34/sq mi)
- Ethnic groups: Inuit

Disko Island (Greenlandic: Qeqertarsuaq, Danish: Diskoøen) is a large island in Baffin Bay, off the west coast of Greenland. It has an area of 8,578 km^{2} (3,312 mi^{2}), making it the second largest island of Greenland (behind the main island), and one of the 100 largest islands in the world. It is part of the Qeqertalik municipality, although it lies off the coast of southern Avannaata municipality, with mainland Qeqertalik a little to the south.

== Etymology ==
The island's Greenlandic name Qeqertarsuaq means The Large Island (from qeqertaq = island).

== Geography ==
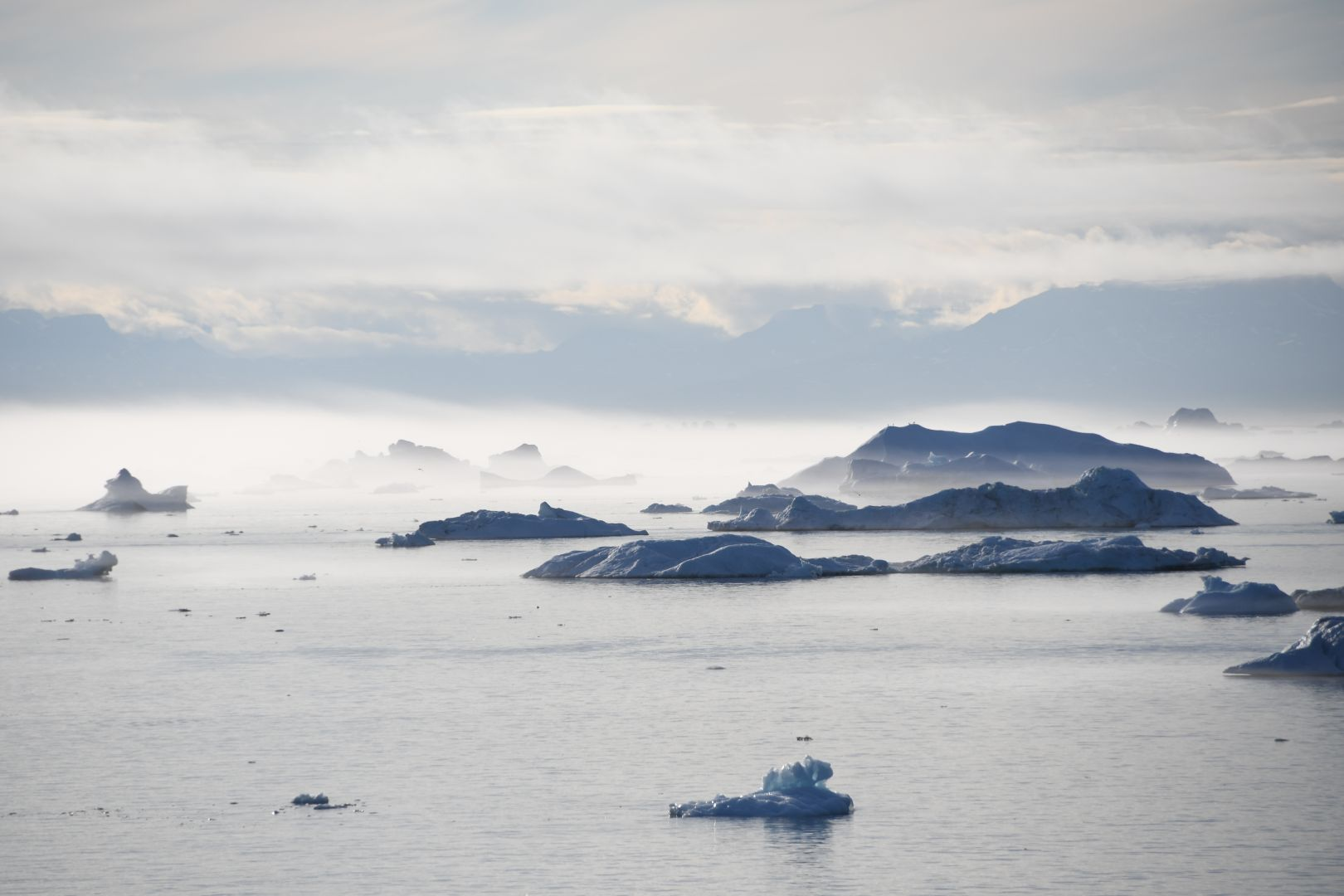
Disko island in the fog from Ilulissat; in front icebergs from Ilulissat Icefjord

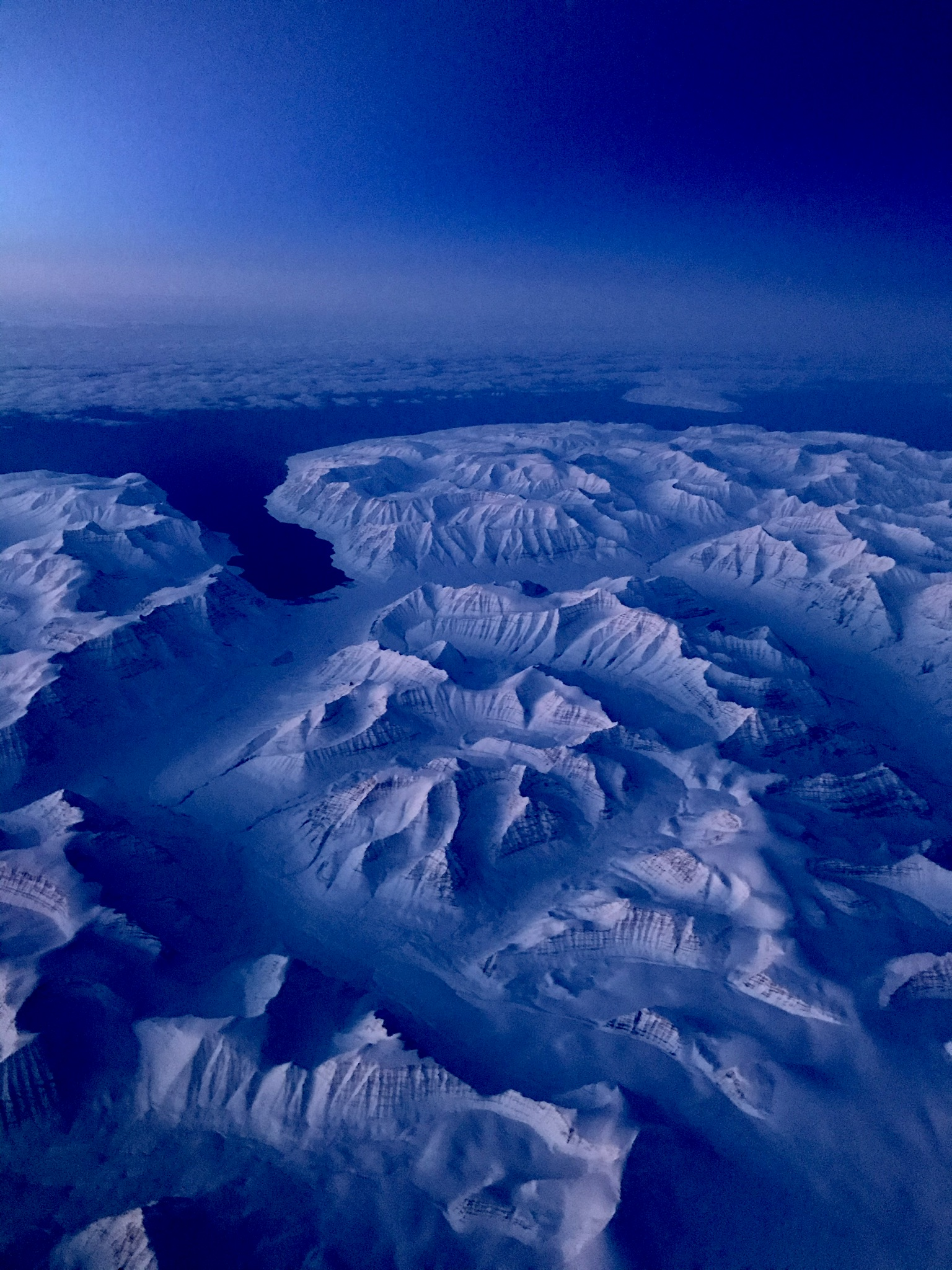
Flying above Disko Island in December

The island has a length of about 160 km (100 mi), rising to an average height of 975 m (3,199 ft), peaking at 1,919 m (6,296 ft). The port of Qeqertarsuaq (named after the island, and also known as Godhavn) lies on its southern coast. Blæsedalen valley is north of Qeqertarsuaq.

The island is separated from Nuussuaq Peninsula in the northeast by the Sullorsuaq Strait. To the south of the island lies Disko Bay, an inlet bay of Baffin Bay.

== History ==
Research indicates that nine large tsunamigenic landslides struck Sullorsuaq Strait in prehistoric times during the Holocene, seven of them from the southern coast of the Nuussuaq Peninsula and two others from the northern coast of Disko Island. Seven of the landslides apparently occurred between about 8020 BC and 6520 BC with unidentified tsunamigenic effects. The two most recent prehistoric landslides generated megatsunamis which struck Alluttoq Island, the first sometime around 5650 BC with a run-up height of 41 to 66 metres (135 to 217 ft), and another that struck around 5350 BC with a run-up height of 45 to 70 metres (148 to 230 ft).

Erik the Red paid the first recorded visit to Disko Island at some time between 982 and 985. The island was used as a base for summer hunting and fishing by Norse colonists.

The coal mining town of Qullissat was founded on the northeast coast of Disko Island in 1924. By 1952 it was a cultural hub and the third-largest settlement in Greenland, with a population of 995. On 15 December 1952, a major landslide on a slope of the mountain Niiortuut (70.349°N 053.178°W) on the southern coast of the Nuussuaq Peninsula generated a tsunami which traveled 30 kilometres (19 mi) across Sullorsuaq Strait and struck Qullissat, where it had a run-up height of 2.2 to 2.7 metres (7 ft 3 in to 8 ft 10 in) and inflicted damage on buildings. By 1966, Qullissat was the sixth-largest town in Greenland with a population of 1,400, but it was abandoned in 1972, leaving the northern coast of Disko Island uninhabited.

On 21 November 2000, a large landslide at Paatuut on the southern coast of the Nuussuaq Peninsula generated a megatsunami with a run-up height of 50 metres (164 ft) near the landslide and 28 metres (92 ft) at the former site of Qullissat, 20 kilometres (11 nmi; 12 mi) away, where it inundated the coast as far as 100 metres (328 ft) inland.

== Geology ==
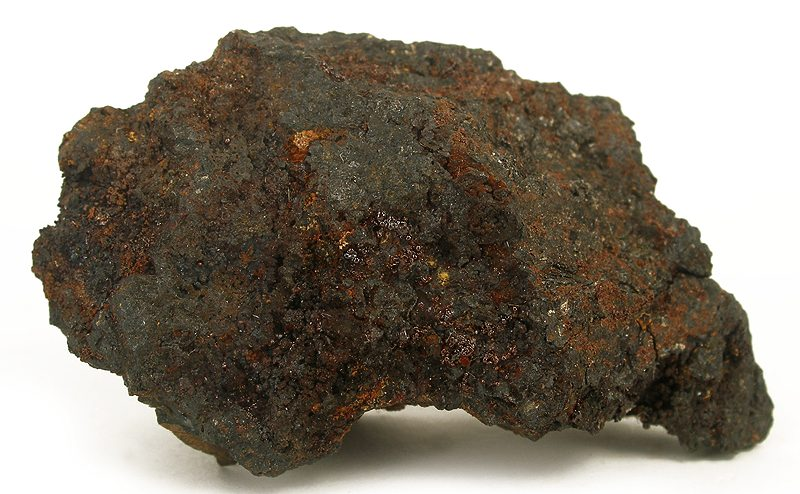
Native iron from Disko Island (size: 4.9 x 2.9 x 1.5 cm [1.9 in. x1.1 in. x 0.6 in.])

Mineral deposits, fossil finds and geological formations add to interest in the area. One of the interesting geological features is the native iron found at the island. A 22-ton (44,000 lbs; 20 tonnes) lump mixture of iron and iron carbide (cohenite) has been found. There are only a few places on earth where native iron is found which is not of meteoric origin.

There are numerous hot springs on the island. The microscopic animal Limnognathia, the only known member of its phylum, was discovered in the Isunngua spring.

== Biodiversity ==
Several studies on the meiofauna show high marine interstitial diversity in Disko Island. For instance, the gastrotrich species Diuronotus aspetos is found in Iterdla and Kigdlugssaitsut and is so far reported only in Disko Island. It is associated with a rich diversity of other gastrotrichs like Chaetonotus atrox, Halichaetonotus sp., Mesodasys sp., Paradasys sp., Tetranchyroderma sp., Thaumastoderma sp., and Turbanella sp.
