= Avannaata =

Municipality of Greenland

Avannaata Norden (Danish)
- Municipality
- Avannaata Municipality; Avannaata Kommunia (Greenlandic); Avannaata Kommune (Danish)
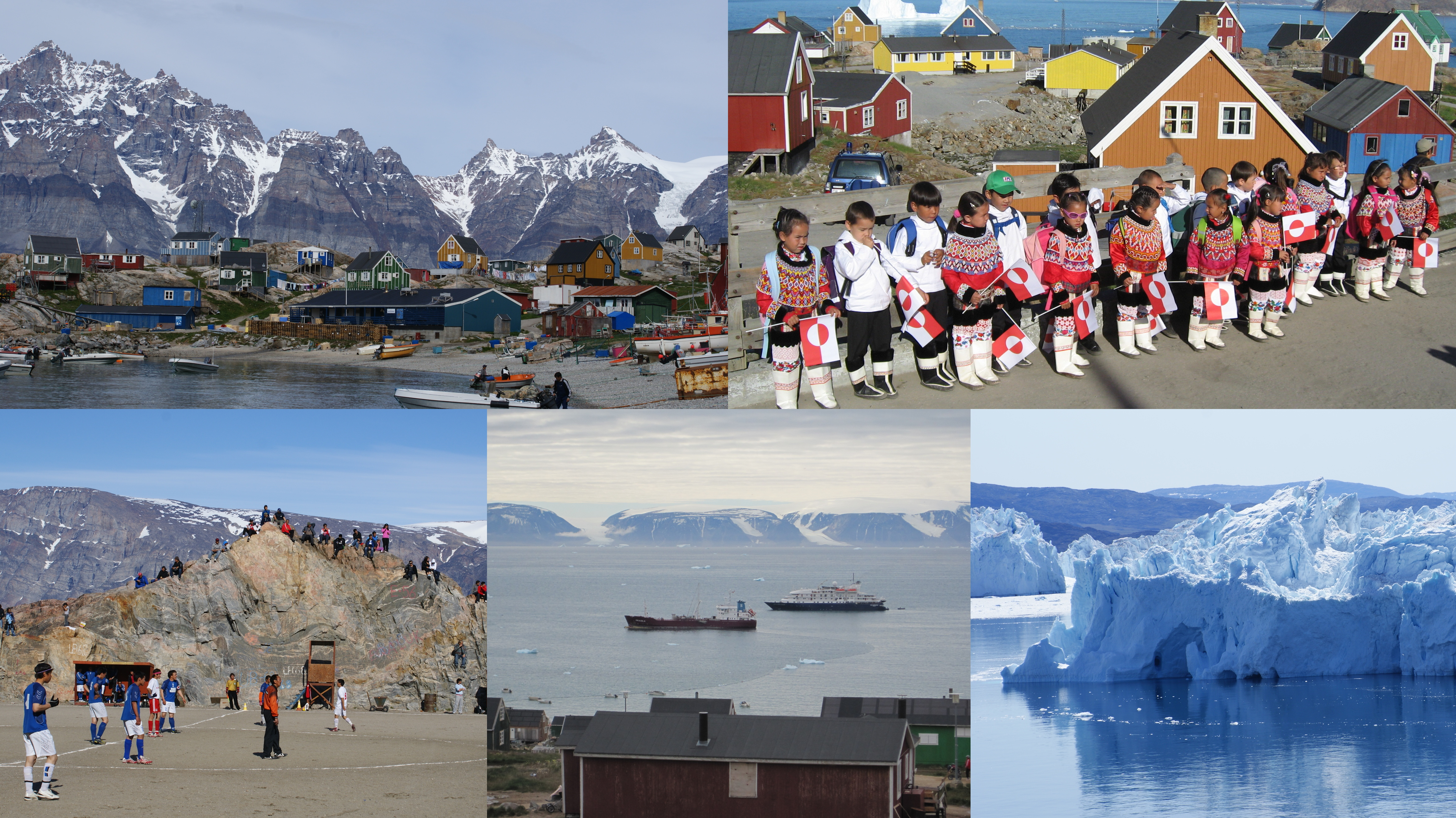
- Clockwise from top left: Ukkusissat, Upernavik, Ilulissat Icefjord, Qaanaaq, Uummannaq

- Flag Coat of arms

- Location of Avannaata within Greenland
- Coordinates (Avannaata Commune): 76°00′N 57°00′W
- Sovereign state: Kingdom of Denmark
- Autonomous Territory: Greenland
- Established: 1 January 2018
- Municipal center: Ilulissat

Government
  - Mayor: Lars Erik Gabrielsen (Siumut)

Area
  - Total: 522,700 km^{2} (201,800 sq mi)

Population (1 January 2025)
  - Total: 10,989
  - Density: 0.02/km^{2} (0.052/sq mi)
- Time zone: UTC-03, UTC-04
- Calling code: +299
- ISO 3166 code: GL-AV
- Website: avannaata.gl

Avannaata (Greenlandic pronunciation: [avanːaːta], Danish: Norden, lit. 'The North') is a municipality of Greenland created on 1 January 2018 from the bulk of the former Qaasuitsup municipality. It encompasses an area of 522,700 km^{2} and has 10,989 inhabitants.

== Geography ==
In the south, Avannaata is flanked by the Qeqertalik municipality. In the southeast, it is bordered by the Sermersooq municipality; the border runs north–south (45° West meridian) through the center of the Greenland ice sheet (Greenlandic: Sermersuaq), so is free of traffic. In the east and northeast it is bordered by the Northeast Greenland National Park. Pituffik Space Base is an enclave on the Avannaata coast that is administered by the United States Space Force.

At the southern end of the municipal coastline are the waters of Disko Bay, although some Disko Bay communities belong to the municipality of Qeqertalik. This bay is an inlet of the larger Baffin Bay, which to the north edges into the island of Greenland in the form of Melville Bay. The coastline of northeastern Baffin Bay is dotted with islands of the Upernavik Archipelago, which is entirely contained within the municipality. In the far northwest near Qaanaaq and Siorapaluk, the municipal shores extend into Nares Strait, which separates Greenland from Canada's Ellesmere Island. Washington Land is the municipality’s northernmost region along with Joe Island.

Avannaata's western side extends to the formerly disputed Hans Island's eastern half, while Canada's Qiqiktaluuk Region administers the western half.

== Politics ==
Avannaata's municipal council consists of 17 members, elected every four years.

=== Municipal council ===
Election	Party					Total seats	Turnout	Elected mayor
Election	A	D	IA	N	S	Total seats	Turnout	Elected mayor
2017	3	1	2	2	9	17	63.1%	Palle Jeremiassen (S)
2021	2	1	3	2	9	17	69.5%	Palle Jeremiassen (S)
2025	2	4	1	3	7	17	60.6%	Lars Erik Gabrielsen (S) (S-N coalition)
Data from Valg.gl

== Administrative divisions ==
=== Ilulissat area ===
- Ilulissat (Jacobshavn)
- Ilimanaq (Claushavn)
- Oqaatsut (Hollandshuk)
- Qeqertaq (Øen)
- Saqqaq (Solsiden)

=== Qaanaaq area ===
- Qaanaaq (Thule)
- Qeqertat
- Savissivik
- Siorapaluk

=== Uummannaq area ===
- Uummannaq
- Ikerasak
- Illorsuit
- Niaqornat
- Nuugaatsiaq
- Qaarsut
- Saattut
- Ukkusissat

=== Upernavik area ===
- Upernavik
- Aappilattoq
- Innaarsuit
- Kangersuatsiaq (Prøven)
- Kullorsuaq
- Naajaat
- Nutaarmiut
- Nuussuaq (Kraulshavn)
- Tasiusaq
- Tussaaq
- Upernavik Kujalleq (Søndre Upernavik)

== Language ==
Kalaallisut, the West Greenlandic dialect, is spoken in the towns and settlements of the western and northwestern coasts. Inuktun is also spoken in and around Qaanaaq.

== See also ==
- KANUKOKA
