= Disko Bay =

Bay on the western coast of Greenland

- Diskobugten
- Qeqertarsuup tunua (Greenlandic)
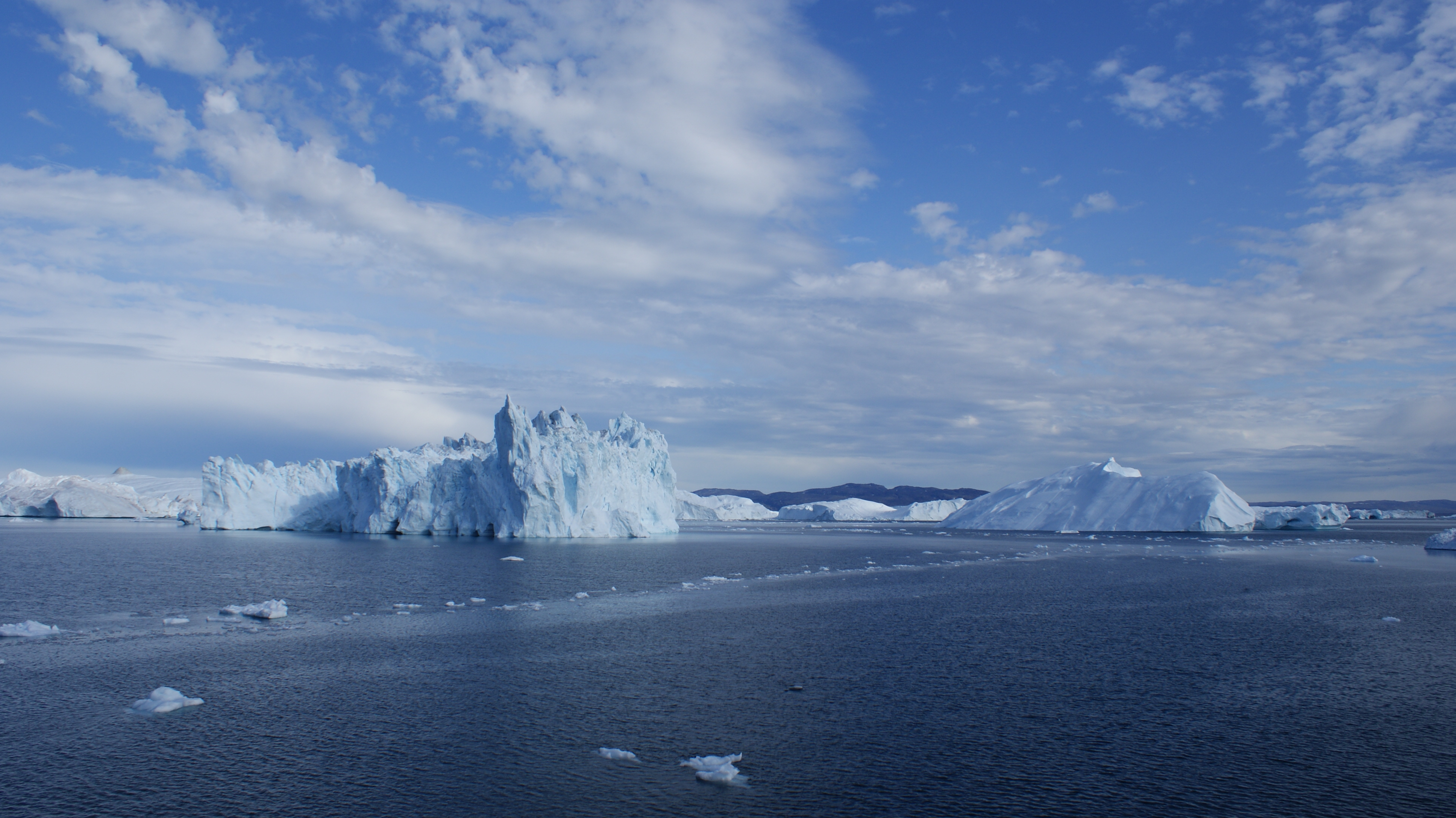
- Icebergs in Disko Bay

- Location in Greenland
- Location: Arctic
- Coordinates: 69°00′N 52°00′W
- Ocean/sea sources: Baffin Bay
- Basin countries: Greenland
- Settlements: Saqqaq, Ilulissat, Ilimanaq, Qasigiannguit, Ikamiut, Akunnaaq, Aasiaat, Kitsissuarsuit

Disko Bay (Greenlandic: Qeqertarsuup tunua; Danish: Diskobugten) is a large bay on the western coast of Greenland. The bay constitutes a wide southeastern inlet of Baffin Bay.

== History ==
It is uncertain when the Inuit first started venturing into Disko Bay, but the Saqqaq were present there between 2400 and 900 BC.

Disko Bay has been an important location for centuries. Its coastline was first encountered by Europeans when Erik the Red started a settlement in 985 AD on the more habitable western coast of Greenland. The two settlements, called the Eastern and Western settlements, were sustenance economies that survived on animal husbandry and farming. Soon after the Western settlement was established, the Norsemen travelled up the coast during the summer thaw and discovered Disko Bay.

Their interest in this bay was due to its rich resources: walruses for ivory, seals for their pelts, and whales for a variety of materials. These products became the main source of income for the Greenlandic settlers who traded with Iceland, the British Isles, and mainland Europe. Without these resources the settlements would probably not have lasted as long as they did.

Norse accounts describe the area as uninhabited when they first explored it. Norse accounts document an eventual trade arrangement with the Inuit who came from the north and west. For a time, both parties made peaceful use of the bay. Later accounts report fighting and massacres on both sides. However, the primary reason for the abandonment of the Greenlandic settlements was the advent of the Little Ice Age that started in the 15th century. There was such an extreme shift in temperature that Disko Bay became inaccessible even in the warmer summer months, thereby destroying the livelihood of the Greenlandic Norse. Even the Eastern settlement, which was below the Arctic Circle, became too cold for habitation. From that time until Danish colonization in the 18th century, the Inuit controlled the Disko Bay area although English and Dutch whalers sometimes visited the area after it was charted during John Davis's third Greenland expedition in 1587.

== Geography ==
Disko Bay

To the south the coastline is complicated with multiple waterways of skerries and small islands in the Aasiaat archipelago. Qasigiannguit and Ilimanaq are the main settlements in the southeastern inlet, just south of the outflow of Ilulissat Icefjord.

From the north the bay is bounded by Qeqertarsuaq (Disko Island), the largest island on the western coast. North of Ilulissat and west of Alluttoq Island the bay transforms into Sullorsuaq Strait separating Qeqertarsuaq from Nuussuaq Peninsula.

It is the largest open bay in western Greenland, measuring 150 kilometres (93 mi) north to south and 100 kilometres (62 mi) east to west. It has an average depth of 400 metres (1,300 ft) and average water temperature of 3.5 °C (38.3 °F), which in winter drops to −1.75 °C (28.85 °F) and then rises up to 12 °C (54 °F) in summer. This is changing, as the bay has been gradually warming up since 1997.

== Wildlife ==
It is home to a wide range of species due to the nutrient-rich waters. This includes benthic and pelagic fish, such as capelin (Mallotus villosus) and cod (Gadus morhua). This attracts migratory seals such as harp (Pagophilus groenlandicus) and hooded seal (Cystophora cristata) and ringed (Pusa hispida) and bearded seal (Erignathus barbatus).

The bay is home during spring time to bowhead (Balaena mysticetus) and humpback (Megaptera novaeangliae) whales, as well as Pilot (Globicephala melas), killer whales (Orcinus orca) and narwhal (Monodon monoceros). On the shores, various birds can be found such as gulls, terns, eider ducks, guillemots, kittiwakes, cormorants and fulmars. Animals such as Arctic foxes, hares and ptarmigan can be encountered around the bay.

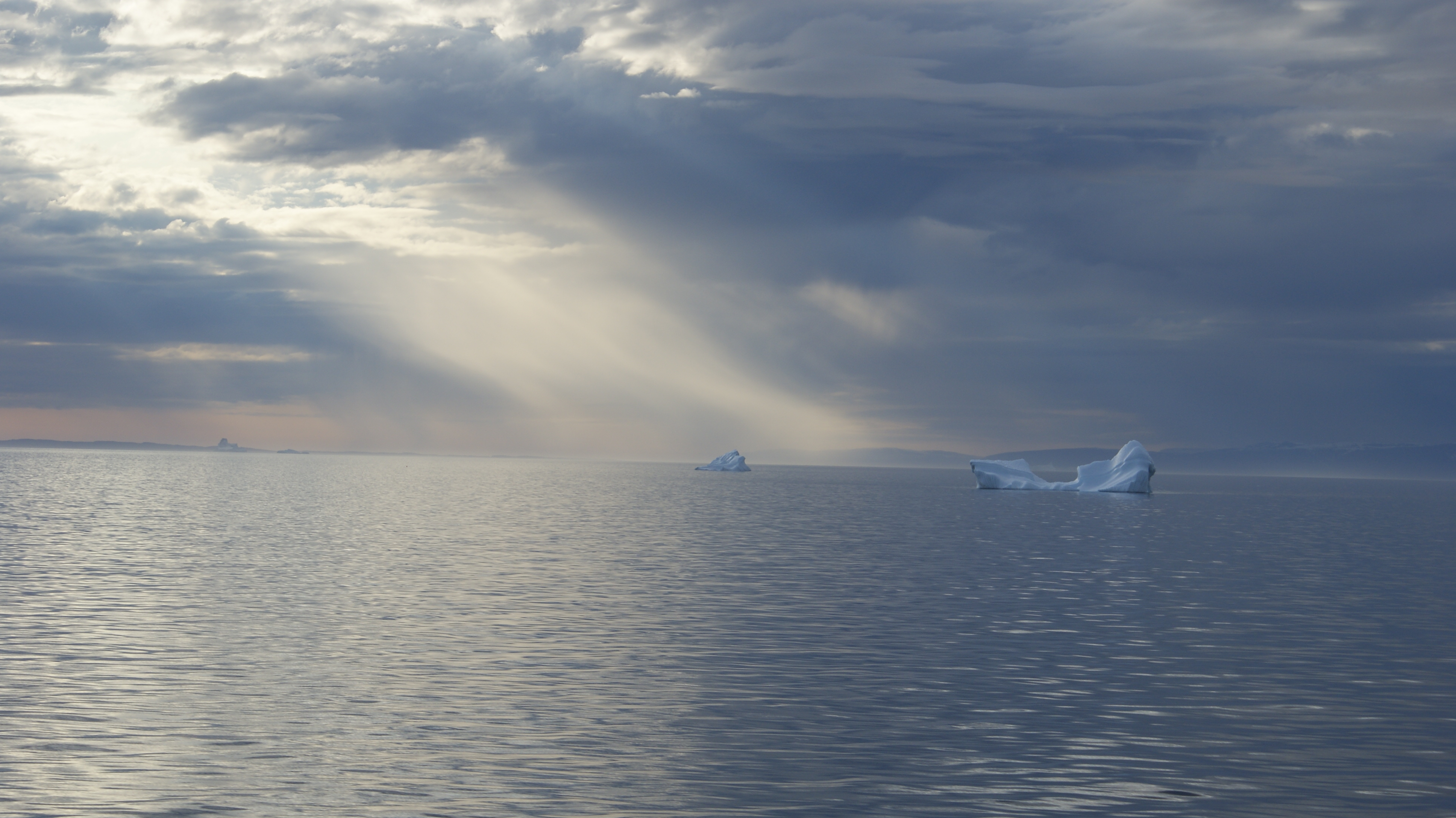
Disko Bay

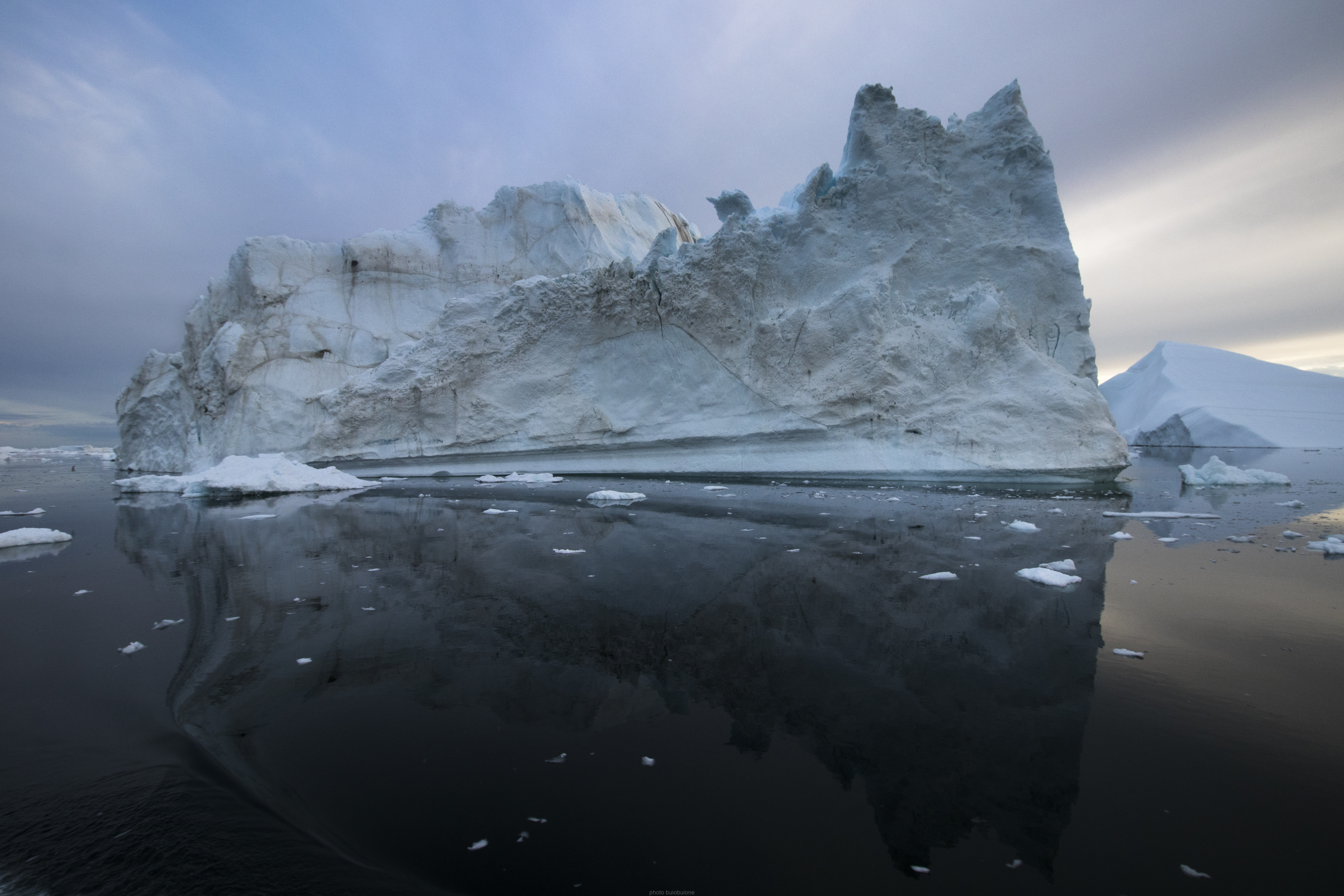
Iceberg in Disko Bay

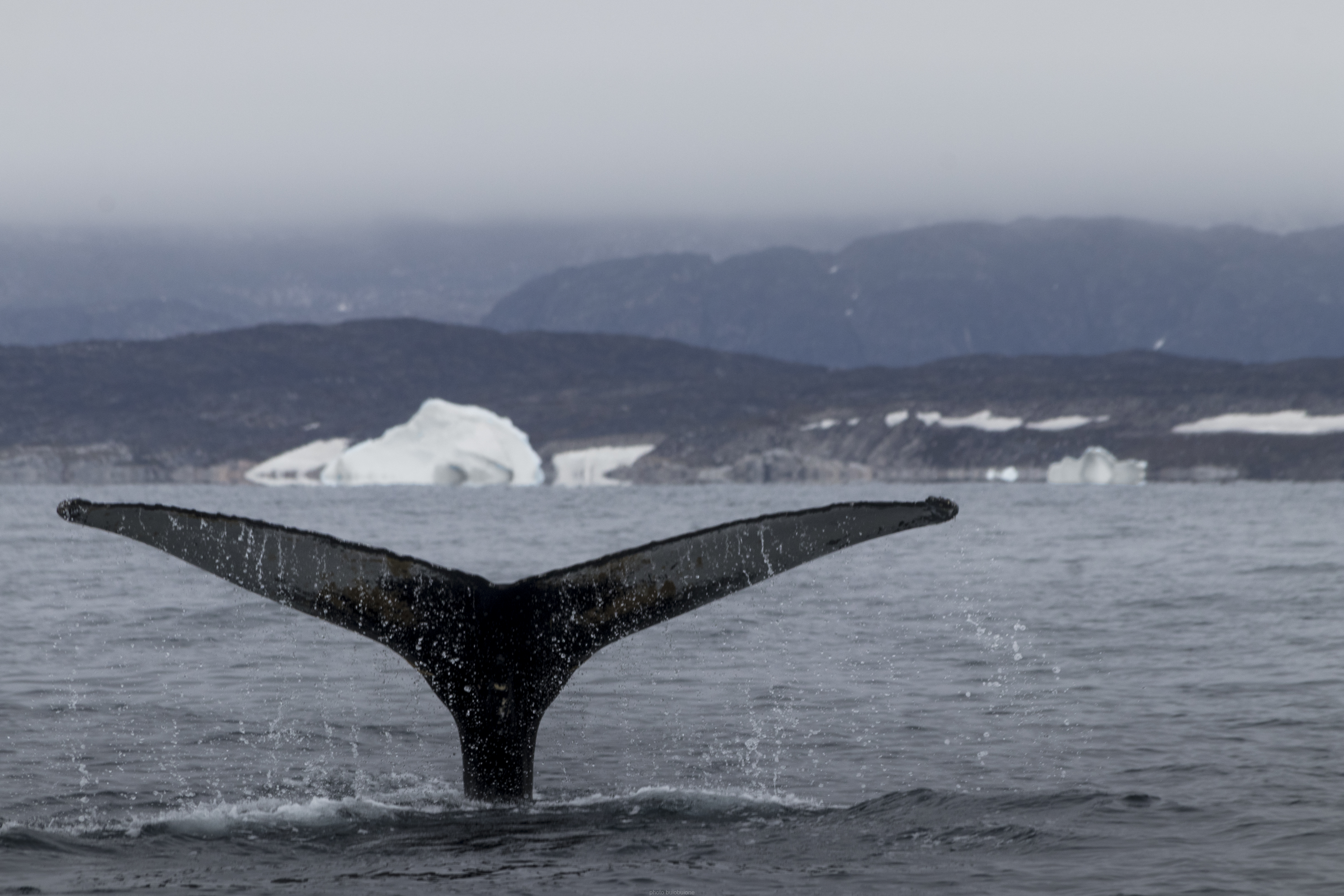
Humpback whale (Megaptera novaeangliae) in Disko Bay
