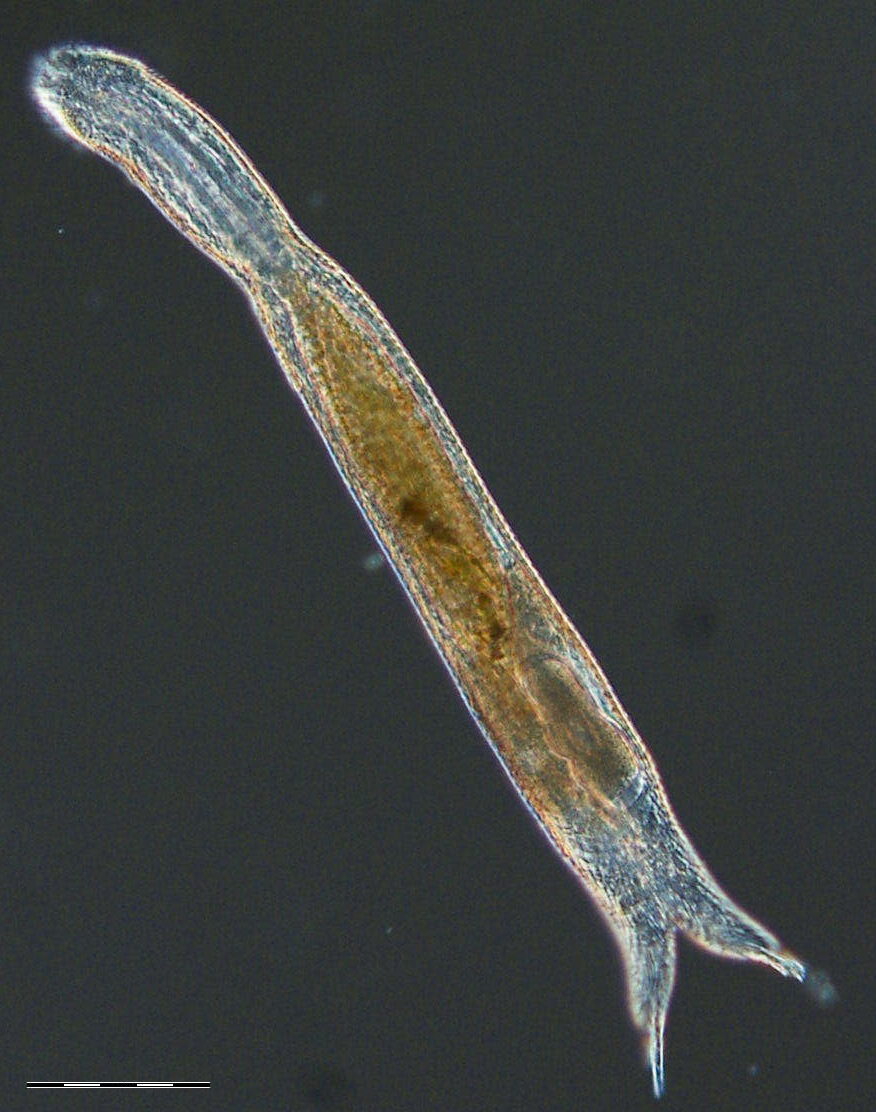
- Diuronotus aspetos

Scientific classification
- Kingdom: Animalia
- Phylum: Gastrotricha
- Order: Chaetonotida
- Family: Muselliferidae
- Genus: Diuronotus
- Species: D. aspetos

Binomial name
- Diuronotus aspetos Todaro, Balsamo & Kristensen, 2005

= Diuronotus aspetos =

Species of microscopic worm

Diuronotus aspetos is a species of large sized meiofaunal chaetonotid gastrotrich found in the North Atlantic. With Diuronotus rupperti, it is one of the only two species representing the genus Diuronotus.

== Distribution and ecology ==
Diuronotus aspetos has originally been considered as a "High Arctic species" found in low Arctic only in winter since it has originally been found in its type locality (Kigdlugssaitsut, Disko Island, West Greenland) exclusively during winter. However, in 2006, the animal has also been sampled during the summer in the bay of Iterdla (also in Disko Island). Specimens are found in 2 to 5 meters water depth in well-sorted sand with detritus. D. aspetos appears to be associated to a rich diversity of Gastrotricha like Chaetonotus atrox, Halichaetonotus sp., Mesodasys sp., Paradasys sp., Tetranchyroderma sp., Thaumastoderma sp. and Turbanella sp. The range of the species was greatly extend in 2012 through discovery of an adolescent specimen from sandy bottom at a depth of 15.5 meters near Wangerooge in the North Sea. This represents a much warmer environment than previously recorded for the species.

== Morphology ==
Diuronotus aspetos is one of the largest chaetonotid gastrotrich with more than 500 μm length. The pharynx is approximately one third of the body length. The mouth forms a muzzle surrounded by a ciliary band connecting the ventral ciliated field. There are no eye spots but there are four to six cephalic cilia. The adults are simultaneous hermaphrodites.

=== Cauda ===
Each of the two cauda forms distally a furca. The second furca of each caudum arises ventrally and bears also an adhesive duo-gland system. These secondary tubes of the furca are one of the most important diagnostic character of the genus Diuronotus. Each of the furca bears scales.

=== Cuticle ===
There is between 40 and 50 cuticular alternating columns enveloping the body, each about approximately 50 scales each. They are relatively elongated and overlap antero-laterally. Each of the scale has a median keel. The interciliary ventral field also bears scales similar to the dorsal ones.

=== Ciliation ===
Apart from the sensory and head cilia mentioned above, the ventral ciliation is continuous and dense, extending from the posterior edge of the mouth to the two-thirds of the pharynx. Then, the ciliary field separates in two bands running until the posterior part of the body. The very anterior part of the ciliary continuous dorsal field is wider than the more posterior part.

== Systematics ==
With Diuronotus rupperti, the genus Diuronotus contains only two species originally included in the subfamily Chaetonotinae Kisielewski, 1991. However, a systematic relationship have been proposed between Diuronotus and the genus Musellifer, justifying the erection of a new family for this two genera: Muselliferidae. The characters justifying this relationship are a muzzle like ciliated structure surrounding the mouth and the homogeneous ultrastructure of the scales. Some characters of the spermatozoids like the presence of supernumerary membranes also justify a close relationship between Diuronotus and Musellifer.
