= Rhodope crucispiculata =

Scientific classification
- Kingdom: Animalia
- Phylum: Mollusca
- Class: Gastropoda
- Family: Rhodopidae
- Genus: Rhodope
- Species: R. crucispiculata

Binomial name
- Rhodope crucispiculata Salvini-Plawen, 1991

Species of gastropods

Rhodope crucispiculata is a species of small meiofaunal sea slug, a shell-less vermiform gastropod mollusk in the family Rhodopidae.

== Feeding habits ==
Rhodopids are the only known predators of placozoans, which make up the primary component of their diet.
