= Rhodope veranii =

- A specimen of Rhodope veranii

Scientific classification
- Kingdom: Animalia
- Phylum: Mollusca
- Class: Gastropoda
- Family: Rhodopidae
- Genus: Rhodope
- Species: R. veranii

Binomial name
- Rhodope veranii Koelliker, 1847

Synonyms
- Rhodope veranyi (misspelling); Sidonia elegans Schulze, 1854

Species of gastropods

Rhodope veranii is a species of small meiofaunal sea slug, a shell-less vermiform gastropod mollusk in the family Rhodopidae. Its worm-like body structure differs considerably from typical gastropods, to the point of being mistaken for a flatworm in the past. It is the type species of the genus Rhodope.

== Feeding habits ==
Rhodopids are the only known predators of placozoans, which make up the primary component of their diet.
