= Rhodope (gastropod) =

- A specimen of Rhodope veranii

Scientific classification
- Kingdom: Animalia
- Phylum: Mollusca
- Class: Gastropoda
- Infraclass: Mesoneura
- Superfamily: Rhodopoidea
- Family: Rhodopidae
- Genus: Rhodope; Koelliker, 1847

Type species
- Rhodope veranii Koelliker, 1847 (monotypy)

Synonyms
- Sidonia Schulze, 1854

Genus of gastropods

Rhodope is a genus of small meiofaunal sea slugs, shell-less vermiform gastropod mollusks in the family Rhodopidae. Their worm-like body structure differs considerably from typical gastropods, to the point of being mistaken for flatworms in the past.

== Feeding habits ==
Rhodopids are the only known predators of placozoans, which make up the primary component of their diet. Some species of Rhodope, such as Rhodope placozophagus, can subsist entirely on a diet of placozoans, and are apparently immune to their toxins.

== Species ==
Species in the genus Rhodope include:

- Rhodope crucispiculata Salvini-Plawen, 1991
- Rhodope marcusi Salvini-Plawen, 1991
- Rhodope placozophagus Cuervo-González, 2017
- Rhodope roskoi Haszprunar & Hess, 2005
- Rhodope rousei Brenzinger, N. G. Wilson & Schrödl, 2011
- Rhodope salviniplaweni Fernández-Simón & Moles, 2025
- Rhodope transtrosa Salvini-Plawen, 1991
- Rhodope veranii Koelliker, 1847
