= Koloonella =

Scientific classification
- Kingdom: Animalia
- Phylum: Mollusca
- Class: Gastropoda
- Infraclass: Mesoneura
- Superfamily: Murchisonelloidea
- Family: Murchisonellidae
- Genus: Koloonella; Laseron, 1959

Type species
- Eulimella moniliformis Hedley & Musson, 1891

Genus of gastropods

Koloonella is a genus of sea snails, marine gastropod mollusks in the family Murchisonellidae, the pyrams and their allies.

== Species ==
Species within the genus Koloonella include:

- Koloonella angusta (Watson, 1885)
- Koloonella buijsi (van Aartsen, Gittenberger & Goud, 2000)
- Koloonella calva (Schander, 1994)
- Koloonella capricornia (Hedley, 1906)
- Koloonella coacta (Watson, 1886)
- Koloonella harrisonae (Tate & May, 1900)
- Koloonella hasta (Laseron, 1951)
- Koloonella hawaiiensis Kay, 1979
- Koloonella ignorabilis (Peñas & Rolán, 1997)
- Koloonella laxa (Watson, 1886)
- Koloonella micra (Petterd, 1884)
- Koloonella minutissima (Laseron, 1951)
- Koloonella moniliformis (Hedley & Musson, 1891)
- Koloonella plunketti (Cotton & Godfrey, 1932)
- Koloonella subtilis (Watson, 1886)
- Koloonella tenuis Laseron, 1959
- Koloonella tomacula (Laseron, 1951)
- Koloonella tricincta (Tate, 1898)
- Koloonella turrita (Petterd, 1884)

Species brought into synonymy

- Koloonella anabathron (Hedley, 1906): synonym of Murchisonella anabathron (Hedley, 1906)

The species is Koloonella hawaiiensis Kay, 1979, considered valid in ITIS, but also listed as Eulimella hawaiiensis in Severns, 2011
