= Rhodope placozophagus =

Scientific classification
- Kingdom: Animalia
- Phylum: Mollusca
- Class: Gastropoda
- Family: Rhodopidae
- Genus: Rhodope
- Species: R. placozophagus

Binomial name
- Rhodope placozophagus Cuervo-González, 2017

Species of gastropods

Rhodope placozophagus is a species of small meiofaunal sea slug, a shell-less vermiform gastropod mollusk in the family Rhodopidae.

== Feeding habits ==
Rhodopids are the only known predators of placozoans, which make up the primary component of their diet. Rhodope placozophagus can subsist entirely on a diet of placozoans, and are apparently immune to their toxins.
