= Rhodope roskoi =

Scientific classification
- Kingdom: Animalia
- Phylum: Mollusca
- Class: Gastropoda
- Family: Rhodopidae
- Genus: Rhodope
- Species: R. roskoi

Binomial name
- Rhodope roskoi Haszprunar & Hess, 2005

Species of gastropods

Rhodope roskoi is a species of small meiofaunal sea slug, a shell-less vermiform gastropod mollusk in the family Rhodopidae.

== Feeding habits ==
Rhodopids are the only known predators of placozoans, which make up the primary component of their diet.
