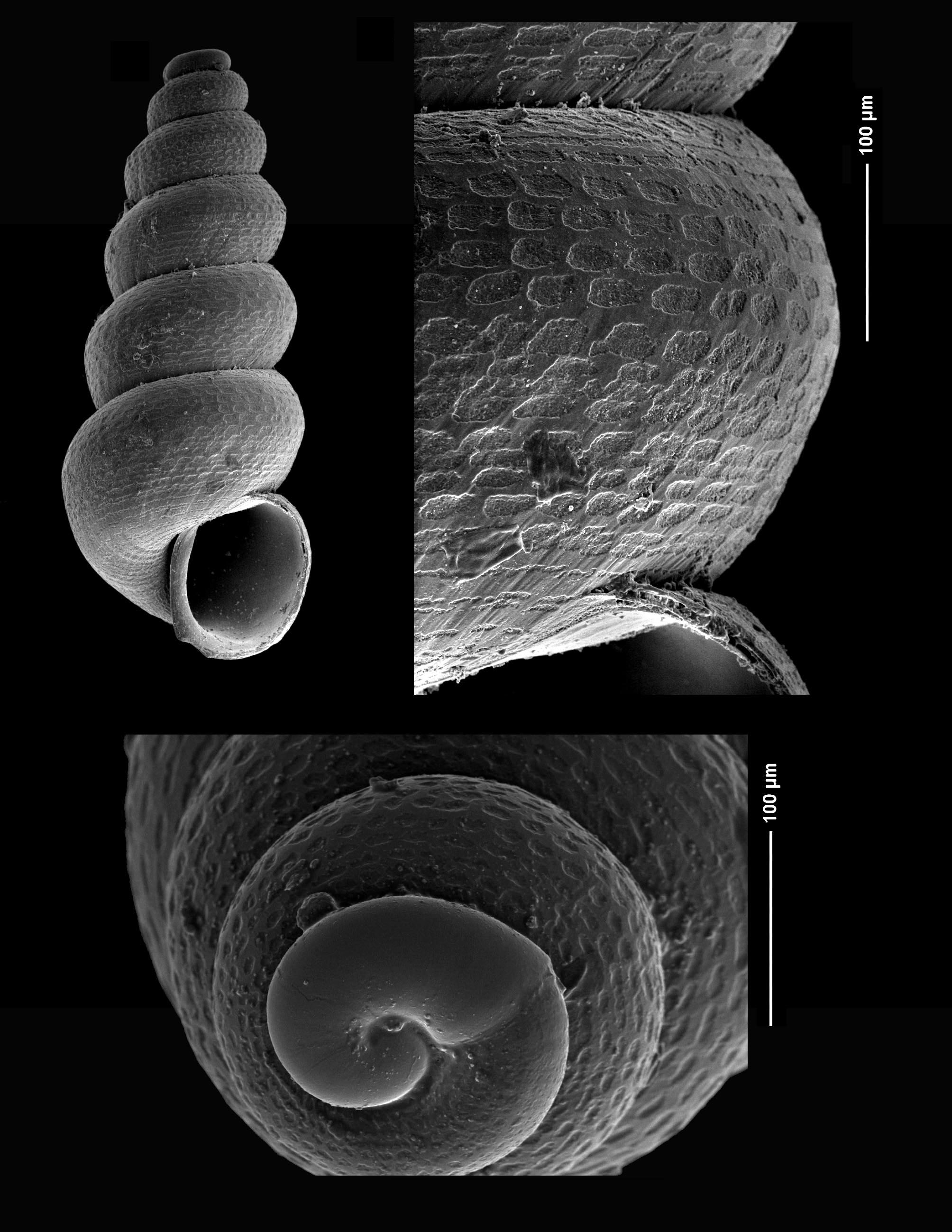
- Shell of Pseudoaclisina conica (holotype at MNHN, Paris)

Scientific classification
- Kingdom: Animalia
- Phylum: Mollusca
- Class: Gastropoda
- Infraclass: Mesoneura
- Superfamily: Murchisonelloidea
- Family: Murchisonellidae
- Genus: Pseudoaclisina; Yoo, 1994

Type species
- † Aclisina turgida Yoo, 1988

= Pseudoaclisina =

Genus of sea snails

Pseudoaclisina is a genus of sea snails, marine gastropod mollusks in the subfamily Murchisonellinae of the family Murchisonellidae, the pyrams and their allies.

== Species ==
- Pseudoaclisina conica Peñas & Rolán, 2013
- Pseudoaclisina indivisa Peñas & Rolán, 2013
- Pseudoaclisina linealis Peñas & Rolán, 2013
- Pseudoaclisina micrometrica Peñas & Rolán, 2013
- Pseudoaclisina multistriata Peñas & Rolán, 2013
- Pseudoaclisina planicula Peñas & Rolán, 2013
- Pseudoaclisina rarisulcata Peñas & Rolán, 2013
- † Pseudoaclisina turgida (Yoo, 1988)
