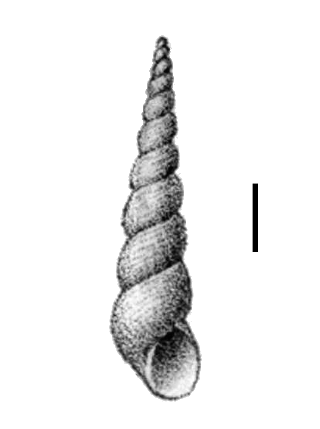
- Drawing of a shell of Ebala nitidissima

Scientific classification
- Kingdom: Animalia
- Phylum: Mollusca
- Class: Gastropoda
- Infraclass: Mesoneura
- Superfamily: Murchisonelloidea
- Family: Murchisonellidae
- Genus: Ebala; Gray, 1847

= Ebala =

Genus of gastropods

Ebala is a genus of sea snails, marine gastropod mollusks in the subfamily Ebalinae, family Murchisonellidae.

Members of the genus Ebala are small (<4 mm) gastropods, the shells of which have a sinistral protoconch. The shell is transparent, sometimes with opaque spots. In contrast to most of the families in the parent superfamily Pyramidelloidea, they do possess a radula. They are found in tropical to temperate waters, often associated with sea grass beds (e.g. Posidonia and Zostera).

== Species ==
Species within the genus Ebala include:

- Ebala communis Bandel, 2005
- Ebala gradata (Monterosato, 1878)
- Ebala micalii (Peñas & Rolán, 2001)
- Ebala nitidissima (Montagu, 1803)
- Ebala pagodula (Yokoyama, 1927)
- Ebala pointeli (de Folin, 1868)
- Ebala scintillans A. Adams, 1861
- Ebala simillima (E. A. Smith, 1890)
- Ebala striatula (Jeffreys, 1856)
- Ebala torquata (Saurin, 1962)
- Ebala trigonostoma (de Folin, 1872)
- Ebala venusta (Melvill, 1904)
- Ebala vestalis A. Adams, 1861
- Ebala virginea A. Adams, 1860
