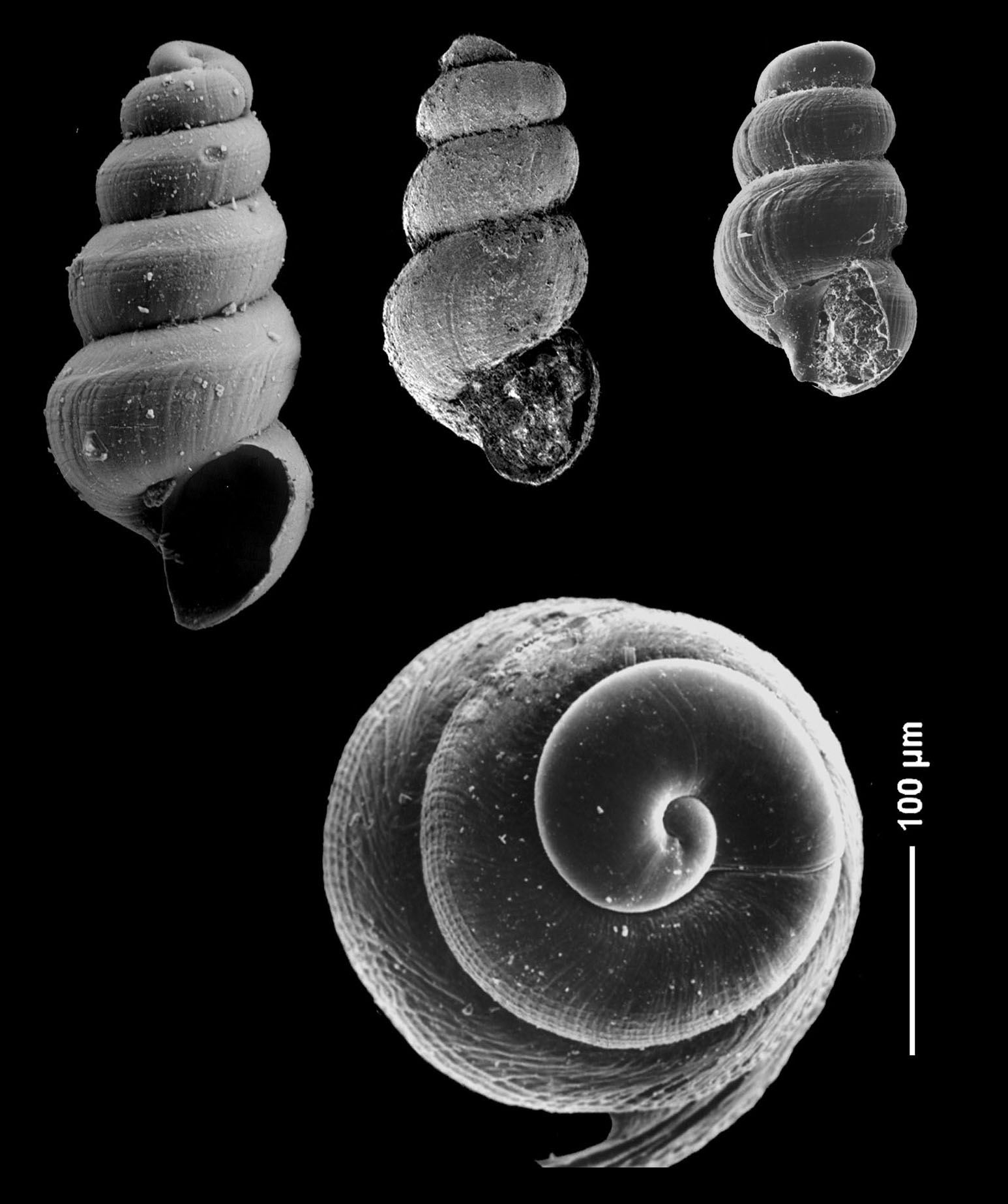
- Shell of Murchisonella africana (paratype at MNHN, Paris)

Scientific classification
- Kingdom: Animalia
- Phylum: Mollusca
- Class: Gastropoda
- Infraclass: Mesoneura
- Superfamily: Murchisonelloidea
- Family: Murchisonellidae
- Genus: Murchisonella; Mörch, 1875

Type species
- Murchisonia spectrum Mörch, 1875

Synonyms
- Bermudaclis Bartsch, 1947; Laseronella Whitley, 1959; Murchisonia Mörch, 1875; Murchisoniella P. Fischer, 1885 (unjustified emendation of Murchisonella); Pandorella Laseron, 1951 (invalid: junior homonym of Pandorella Conrad, 1863; Laseronella is a replacement name)

= Murchisonella =

Genus of sea snails

Murchisonella is a genus of sea snails, marine gastropod mollusks in the subfamily Murchisonellinae of the family Murchisonellidae, the pyrams and their allies.

== Species ==
Species within the genus Murchisonella include:

- Murchisonella africana Peñas & Rolán, 2013
- Murchisonella anabathron (Hedley, 1906)
- Murchisonella angolensis Peñas & Rolán, 2013
- Murchisonella aqabaensis (Bandel, 2005)
- Murchisonella arabica Bandel, 2005
- †Murchisonella bezanconi (Cossmann, 1892)
- Murchisonella cebuana Bandel, 2005
- Murchisonella columna (Hedley, 1907)
- Murchisonella curvistriata Peñas & Rolán, 2013
- Murchisonella declivita (Laseron, 1951)
- Murchisonella densistriata (Nomura, 1936)
- Murchisonella dubia Peñas & Rolán, 2013
- Murchisonella evermanni (Baker, Hanna & Strong, 1928)
- Murchisonella galapagensis Peñas & Rolán, 2013
- Murchisonella hatienensis (Saurin, 1962)
- Murchisonella latisulcata Peñas & Rolán, 2013
- Murchisonella mediterranea Peñas & Rolán, 2013
- Murchisonella modesta Peñas & Rolán, 2013
- Murchisonella modestissima Peñas & Rolán, 2013
- Murchisonella occidentalis (Hemphill, 1894)
- Murchisonella saotomensis Peñas & Rolán, 2013
- Murchisonella spectrum (Mörch, 1875)
- Murchisonella subangulata (Laseron, 1959)
- Murchisonella ultima Rolán, Fernández-Garcés & Rubio, 2013

Species brought into synonymy

- Murchisonella gittenbergeri (De Jong & Coomans, 1988): synonym of Aclis gittenbergeri (De Jong & Coomans, 1988)
