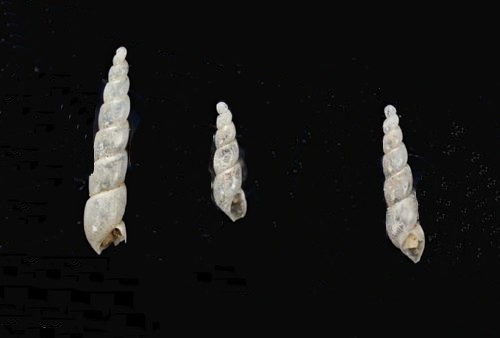
- Shell of Ebala simillima (specimens at the Natural History Museum, London))

Scientific classification
- Kingdom: Animalia
- Phylum: Mollusca
- Class: Gastropoda
- Family: Murchisonellidae
- Genus: Ebala
- Species: E. simillima

Binomial name
- Ebala simillima (E. A. Smith, 1890)

Synonyms
- Aclis simillima E. A. Smith, 1890 superseded combination

= Ebala simillima =

Species of gastropod

Ebala simillima is a species of sea snail, a marine gastropod mollusk in the family Eulimidae.

== Description ==
The length of the shell attains 2.5 mm, its diameter is 0.5 mm.

== Distribution ==
This species occurs in the Atlantic Ocean off Saint Helena.
