= Koloonella minutissima =

Scientific classification
- Kingdom: Animalia
- Phylum: Mollusca
- Class: Gastropoda
- Family: Murchisonellidae
- Genus: Koloonella
- Species: K. minutissima

Binomial name
- Koloonella minutissima (Laseron, 1951)

Synonyms
- Eulimella minutissima Laseron, 1951 (basionym)

Species of gastropod

Koloonella minutissima is a species of sea snail, a marine gastropod mollusk in the family Murchisonellidae, the pyrams and their allies.

== Distribution ==
This marine species occurs off Eastern Australia and New South Wales.
