= Koloonella ignorabilis =

Scientific classification
- Kingdom: Animalia
- Phylum: Mollusca
- Class: Gastropoda
- Family: Murchisonellidae
- Genus: Koloonella
- Species: K. ignorabilis

Binomial name
- Koloonella ignorabilis (Peñas & Rolán, 1997)

Synonyms
- Eulimella ignorabilis Peñas & Rolán, 1997 (original combination)

Species of gastropod

Koloonella ignorabilis is a species of sea snail, a marine gastropod mollusk in the family Pyramidellidae, the pyrams and their allies.

== Description ==
The size of the shell varies between 3.5 mm and 5.2 mm.

== Distribution ==
This species occurs in the Atlantic Ocean between Mauritania, Guinea and Angola at depths between 0 m and 75 m.
