= Koloonella tenuis =

Scientific classification
- Kingdom: Animalia
- Phylum: Mollusca
- Class: Gastropoda
- Family: Murchisonellidae
- Genus: Koloonella
- Species: K. tenuis

Binomial name
- Koloonella tenuis Laseron, 1959

Species of gastropod

Koloonella tenuis is a species of sea snail, a marine gastropod mollusk in the family Murchisonellidae, the pyrams and their allies.

== Distribution ==
This marine species occurs off Queensland, Australia.
