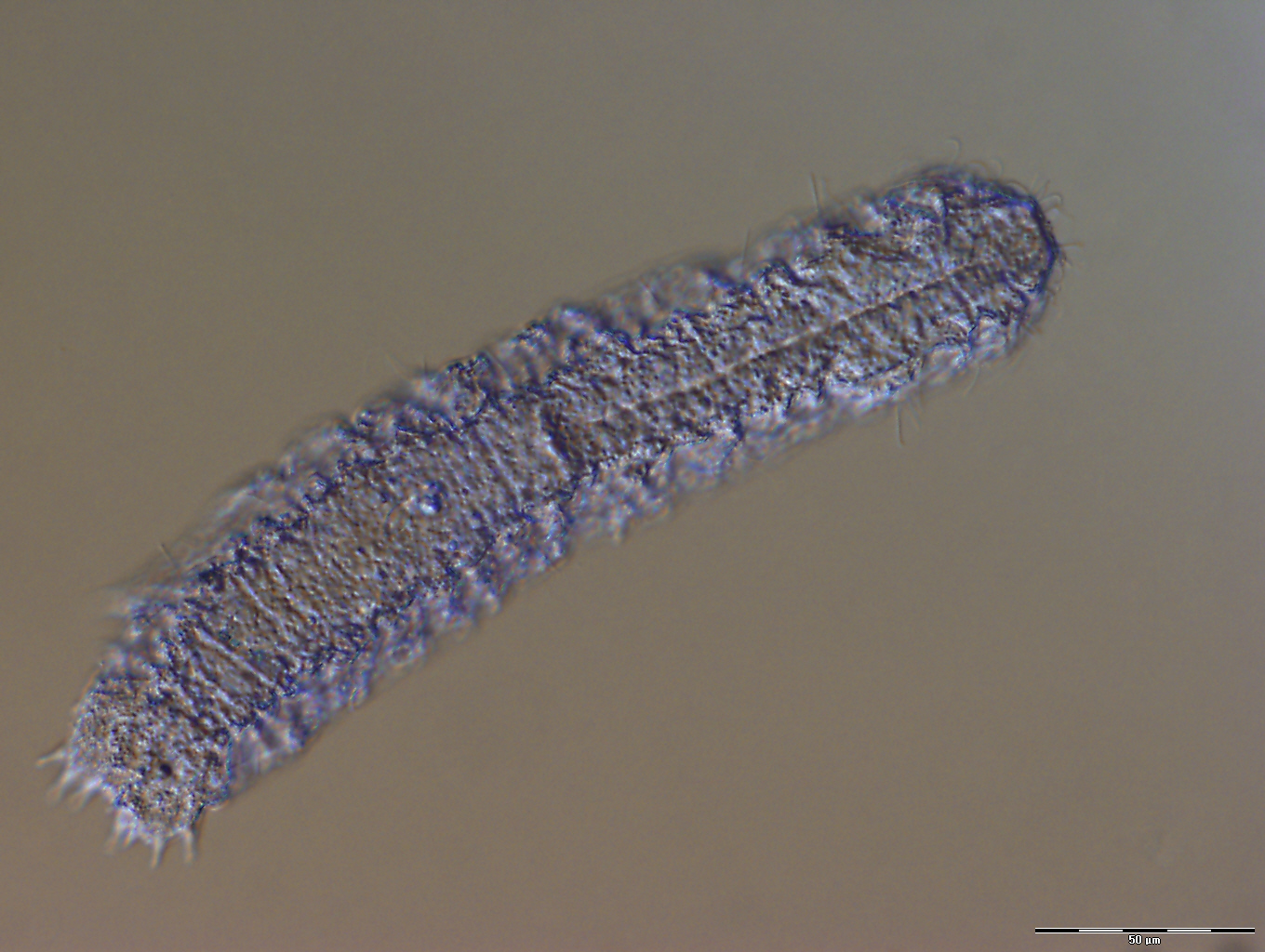

Scientific classification
- Kingdom: Animalia
- Phylum: Gastrotricha
- Order: Macrodasyida
- Family: Cephalodasyidae
- Genus: Paradasys
- Species: P. subterraneus

Binomial name
- Paradasys subterraneus Remane, 1934

= Paradasys subterraneus =

Species of microscopic worm

Paradasys subterraneus is a Gastrotricha with a bodylength up to 0.6 mm. The species is marine.

== Morphology ==
Gastrotricha are microscopic animals ranging from 0.06-3.0 mm in body length. Paradasys subterraneus has a bodylength up to 0.6 mm (Karling 1954).

== Ecology ==
Gastrotricha are aquatic free-living worms, belonging to the benthic meiofauna. They have a high density in marine sediments and are often among top three of meiofauna found here, only surpassed by nematoda and harpacticoid Copepoda. The density of Gastrotrica can be as high as 364 individuals/10 cm2. Distribution of Paradasys subterraneus: British Isles, East North Atlantic, European waters (ERMS scope), Mediterranean Sea, Polish Exclusive Economic Zone, United Kingdom Economic Zone, Wimereux

== Systematics ==
The phylogenetic relationships of the Gastrotricha are still unclear: Morphological studies place Gastrostricha near the Gnathostomulida, the Rotifera, or the Nematoda. Molecular data have shown that the Gastrotricha are sister taxon to the Platyhelminthes. Later studies have placed them elsewhere, including close to the Ecdysozoa or the Lophotrochozoa.
