= Koloonella coacta =

Scientific classification
- Kingdom: Animalia
- Phylum: Mollusca
- Class: Gastropoda
- Family: Murchisonellidae
- Genus: Koloonella
- Species: K. coacta

Binomial name
- Koloonella coacta (Watson, 1886)

Synonyms
- Eulimella coacta Watson, 1886 (basionym); Zonella coacta (Laseron, 1959)

Species of gastropod

Koloonella coacta, common name the forced pyramid-shell, is a species of sea snail, a marine gastropod mollusk in the family Murchisonellidae, the pyrams and their allies.

== Distribution ==
This marine species occurs off the Northern Territory, Queensland and Tasmania.
