= Koloonella turrita =

Scientific classification
- Kingdom: Animalia
- Phylum: Mollusca
- Class: Gastropoda
- Family: Murchisonellidae
- Genus: Koloonella
- Species: K. turrita

Binomial name
- Koloonella turrita (Petterd, 1884)

Synonyms
- Aclis turrita Petterd, 1884 (basionym); Eulimella turrita (Petterd, 1884)

Species of gastropod

Koloonella turrita, common name the turret pyramid-shell, is a species of sea snail, a marine gastropod mollusk in the family Murchisonellidae, the pyrams and their allies.

== Distribution ==
This marine species occurs off Eastern Australia, New South Wales, Victoria, Australia, Western Australia, the Bass Strait and Tasmania.
