= Copidognathus longispinus =

Scientific classification
- Domain: Eukaryota
- Kingdom: Animalia
- Phylum: Arthropoda
- Subphylum: Chelicerata
- Class: Arachnida
- Order: Trombidiformes
- Family: Halacaridae
- Genus: Copidognathus
- Species: C. longispinus

Binomial name
- Copidognathus longispinus Bartsch & Iliffe, 1985

Species of mite

Copidognathus longispinus is a species of mite in the Halacaridae family. The scientific name of this species was first published in 1985 by Bartsch & Iliffe.
