= Murchisonella aqabaensis =

Scientific classification
- Kingdom: Animalia
- Phylum: Mollusca
- Class: Gastropoda
- Family: Murchisonellidae
- Genus: Murchisonella
- Species: M. aqabaensis

Binomial name
- Murchisonella aqabaensis (Bandel, 2005)

Synonyms
- Hemiaclis aqabaensis Bandel, 2005

Species of gastropod

Murchisonella aqabaensis is a species of sea snail, a marine gastropod mollusk in the family Murchisonellidae.

== Distribution ==
This marine species occurs in the Gulf of Aqaba, Northern Red Sea.
