= Koloonella buijsi =

Scientific classification
- Kingdom: Animalia
- Phylum: Mollusca
- Class: Gastropoda
- Family: Murchisonellidae
- Genus: Koloonella
- Species: K. buijsi

Binomial name
- Koloonella buijsi (van Aartsen, Gittenberger & Goud, 2000)

Synonyms
- Eulimella buijsi van Aartsen, Gittenberger & Goud, 2000 (original combination)

Species of gastropod

Koloonella buijsi is a species of sea snail, a marine gastropod mollusk in the family Pyramidellidae, the pyrams and their allies.

The epithet "buijsi" refers to Mr J.P. Buijs, a malacologist from The Hague, the Netherlands,

== Description ==
The size of the shell varies between 3 mm and 3.7 mm. The color of the smooth, slender conical shell varies between whitish to a creamy color. The teleoconch contains 4½ to 5½ slightly convex whorls with a marked suture and without a spiral mocrosculpture. The outerlip has an even structure, lacking teeth, and is smooth on the inside. There is no umbilicus.

== Distribution ==
This species occurs in the following locations:

- Cape Verdes at a depth of 710 m.
