= Koloonella laxa =

Scientific classification
- Kingdom: Animalia
- Phylum: Mollusca
- Class: Gastropoda
- Family: Murchisonellidae
- Genus: Koloonella
- Species: K. laxa

Binomial name
- Koloonella laxa (Watson, 1886)

Synonyms
- Eulimella laxa Watson, 1886 (basionym)

Species of gastropod

Koloonella laxa is a species of sea snail, a marine gastropod mollusk in the family Murchisonellidae, the pyrams and their allies.

== Distribution ==
This marine species occurs off Queensland, Australia.
