= Koloonella moniliformis =

Scientific classification
- Kingdom: Animalia
- Phylum: Mollusca
- Class: Gastropoda
- Family: Murchisonellidae
- Genus: Koloonella
- Species: K. moniliformis

Binomial name
- Koloonella moniliformis (Hedley & Musson, 1891)

Synonyms
- Eulimella moniliforme Hedley & Musson, 1891 (original combination; incorrect gender ending); Eulimella moniliformis Hedley & Musson, 1891

Species of gastropod

Koloonella moniliformis, common name the necklace pyramid-shell, is a species of sea snail, a marine gastropod mollusk in the family Murchisonellidae, the pyrams and their allies.

== Distribution ==
This marine species occurs off Eastern Australia, New South Wales, Victoria, Australia, and Tasmania.
