= Murchisonella evermanni =

Scientific classification
- Kingdom: Animalia
- Phylum: Mollusca
- Class: Gastropoda
- Family: Murchisonellidae
- Genus: Murchisonella
- Species: M. evermanni

Binomial name
- Murchisonella evermanni (Baker, Hanna & Strong, 1928)

Synonyms
- Cingulina evermanni (F. Baker, Hanna & A. M. Strong, 1928); Turbonilla evermanni Baker, Hanna & Strong, 1928 (original combination)

Species of gastropod

Murchisonella evermanni is a species of sea snail, a marine gastropod mollusk in the family Murchisonellidae, the pyrams and their allies.

== Distribution ==
- Marine
