= Copidognathus oculatus =

Scientific classification
- Domain: Eukaryota
- Kingdom: Animalia
- Phylum: Arthropoda
- Subphylum: Chelicerata
- Class: Arachnida
- Order: Trombidiformes
- Family: Halacaridae
- Genus: Copidognathus
- Species: C. oculatus

Binomial name
- Copidognathus oculatus (Hodge, 1863)

Species of mite

Copidognathus oculatus is a species of mite in the Halacaridae family. The scientific name of the species was first published in 1863 by Hodge.
