= Koloonella hasta =

Scientific classification
- Kingdom: Animalia
- Phylum: Mollusca
- Class: Gastropoda
- Family: Murchisonellidae
- Genus: Koloonella
- Species: K. hasta

Binomial name
- Koloonella hasta (Laseron, 1951)

Synonyms
- Eulimella hasta Laseron, 1951

Species of gastropod

Koloonella hasta is a species of sea snail, a marine gastropod mollusk in the family Murchisonellidae, the pyrams and their allies.

== Distribution ==
This marine species occurs off Eastern Australia and New South Wales.

== Bibliography ==
- Iredale, T. & McMichael, D.F. (1962). A reference list of the marine Mollusca of New South Wales. Memoirs of the Australian Museum. 11 : 1-109
