= Koloonella micra =

Scientific classification
- Kingdom: Animalia
- Phylum: Mollusca
- Class: Gastropoda
- Family: Murchisonellidae
- Genus: Koloonella
- Species: K. micra

Binomial name
- Koloonella micra (Petterd, 1884)

Synonyms
- Aclis micra Petterd, 1884 (basionym)

Species of gastropod

Koloonella micra, common name the minute pyramid-shell, is a species of sea snail, a marine gastropod mollusk in the family Murchisonellidae, the pyrams and their allies.

== Distribution ==
These marine species occurs off the coast of Tasmania.
