= Koloonella calva =

Scientific classification
- Kingdom: Animalia
- Phylum: Mollusca
- Class: Gastropoda
- Family: Murchisonellidae
- Genus: Koloonella
- Species: K. calva

Binomial name
- Koloonella calva (Schander, 1994)

Synonyms
- Eulimella calva Schander, 1994 (original combination)

Species of gastropod

Koloonella calva is a species of sea snail, a marine gastropod mollusk in the family Pyramidellidae, the pyrams and their allies.
