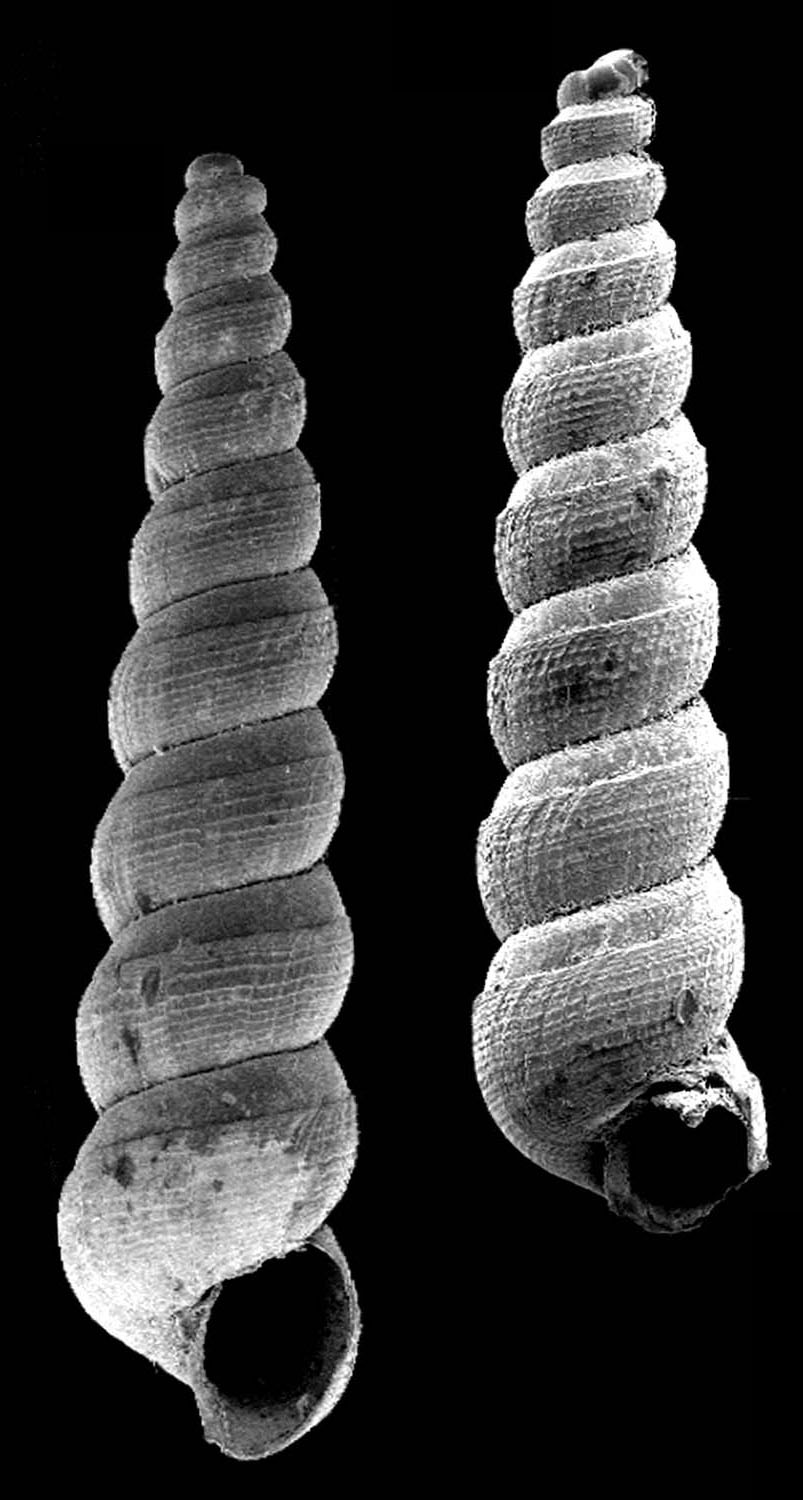
- Shell of Murchisonella anabathron (specimen at MNHN, Paris)

Scientific classification
- Kingdom: Animalia
- Phylum: Mollusca
- Class: Gastropoda
- Family: Murchisonellidae
- Genus: Murchisonella
- Species: M. anabathron

Binomial name
- Murchisonella anabathron (Hedley, 1906)

Synonyms
- Eulimella anabathron Hedley, 1906 (basionym); Koloonella anabathron (Hedley, 1906)

= Murchisonella anabathron =

Species of gastropod

Murchisonella anabathron, common name the platform pyramid-shell, is a species of sea snail, a marine gastropod mollusk in the family Murchisonellidae, the pyrams and their allies.

== Distribution ==
This species occurs off Eastern Australia, New South Wales and Tasmania; also off New Caledonia.
