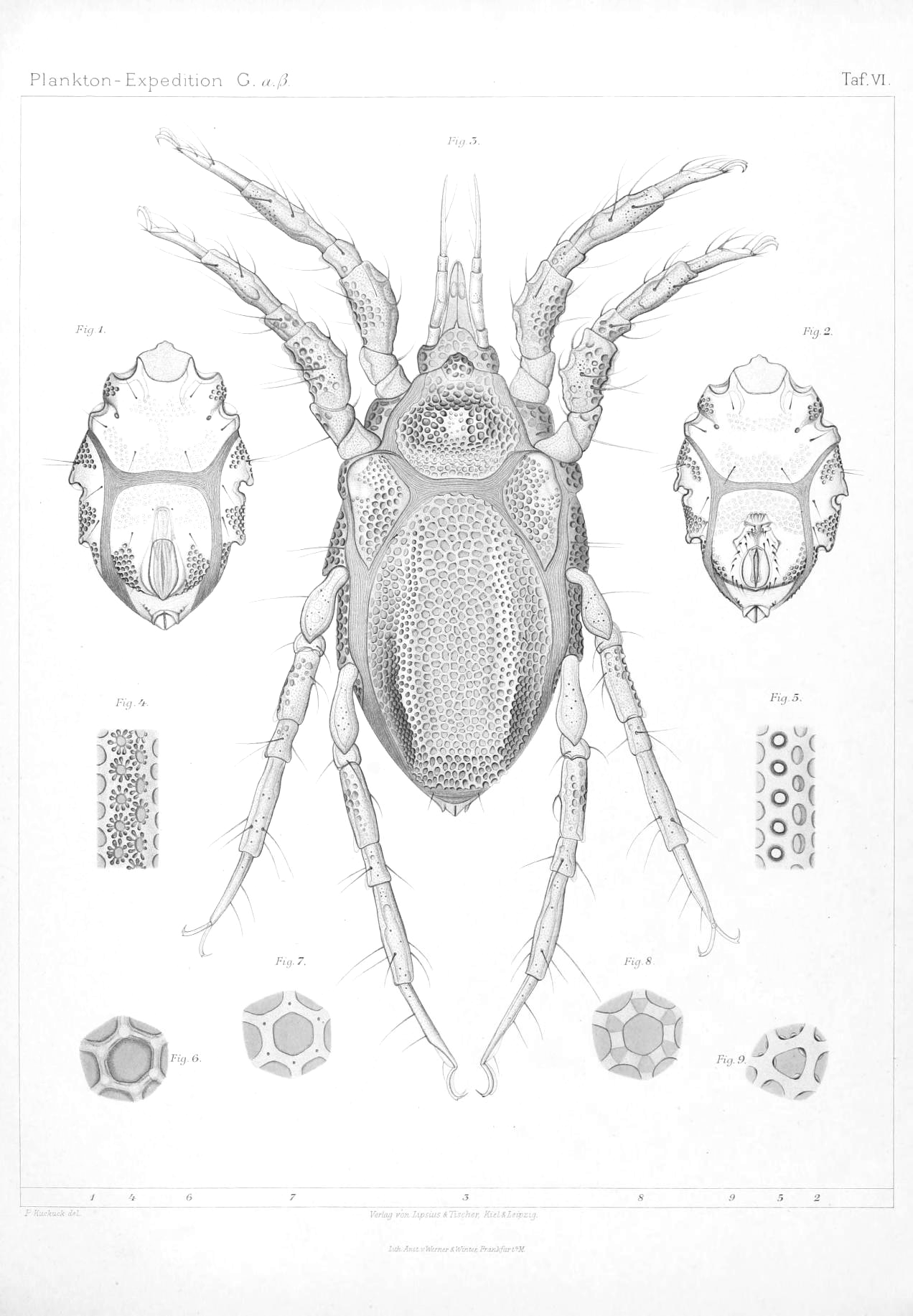
- Morphology of Copidognathus lamellosus, sketch by Paul Ernst Hermann Kuckuck, 1893

Scientific classification
- Domain: Eukaryota
- Kingdom: Animalia
- Phylum: Arthropoda
- Subphylum: Chelicerata
- Class: Arachnida
- Order: Trombidiformes
- Family: Halacaridae
- Genus: Copidognathus; Trouessart, 1888

Species
- See text

= Copidognathus =

Genus of mites

Copidognathus is a genus of mites in the family Halacaridae. Copidognathus is a large genus with over 380 accepted species.

== Species ==
The following species list is adapted from the World Register of Marine Species. Species appearing in other sources are cited to those sources.

=== A–C ===
- Copidognathus abyssiculus Bartsch, 1982
- Copidognathus abyssorum Bartsch, 1982
- Copidognathus acanthophorus Viets, 1950
- Copidognathus acanthoscelus Bartsch, 1992
- Copidognathus acnemus Bartsch, 1986
- Copidognathus acutus Newell, 1947
- Copidognathus adonis Otto, 2001
- Copidognathus adriaticus Viets, 1940
- Copidognathus aenigmatus Otto, 2000
- Copidognathus aequalivestitus Viets, 1950
- Copidognathus africanus Bartsch, 1972
- Copidognathus alvinus Bartsch, 1994
- Copidognathus amalus Bartsch, 1999
- Copidognathus amaurus Bartsch, 1999
- Copidognathus americanus Bartsch, 1979
- Copidognathus ampliatus Bartsch, 1994
- Copidognathus andamanensis Chatterjee & De Troch, 2003
- Copidognathus andhraensis Chatterjee, Annapurna & Chang, 2004
- Copidognathus angulipes Newell, 1984
- Copidognathus angusticeps Bartsch, 2007
- Copidognathus angustus Viets, 1936
- Copidognathus anops Newell, 1971
- Copidognathus arabicus Chatterjee & Chang, 2004
- Copidognathus arcticus Sokolov, 1946
- Copidognathus arcuatus Newell, 1984
- Copidognathus areolatus Bartsch, 1989
- Copidognathus aricae Newell, 1984
- Copidognathus arnaudi Newell, 1984
- Copidognathus asketus Otto, 2000
- Copidognathus asperatus Newell, 1984
- Copidognathus atlanticus Bartsch, 1982
- Copidognathus attalus Bartsch, 1999
- Copidognathus aurorae Newell, 1951
- Copidognathus australensis (Lohmann, 1909)
- Copidognathus bairdi Newell, 1947
- Copidognathus bairdiensis Bartsch, 1984
- Copidognathus balakrishnani Chatterjee, 2000
- Copidognathus barrierensis Otto, 2001
- Copidognathus basidentatus (Trouessart, 1899)
- Copidognathus bavayi (Trouessart, 1896)
- Copidognathus bengalensis Chatterjee, Annapurna & Chang, 2003
- Copidognathus bermudensis Bartsch & Iliffe, 1985
- Copidognathus biodomus Bartsch, 1997
- Copidognathus biscayneus Newell, 1947
- Copidognathus bispinus Bartsch, 1994
- Copidognathus bistriatus Bartsch, 1994
- Copidognathus bituberosus Newell, 1971
- Copidognathus boraeus Bartsch, 1992
- Copidognathus borealis Makarova, 1978
- Copidognathus brachyrhynchus André, 1959
- Copidognathus brachystomus Viets, 1940
- Copidognathus brevimaxillaris Newell, 1951
- Copidognathus brevipes Viets, 1940
- Copidognathus brevirostris Viets, 1927
- Copidognathus brifacius Bartsch, 1989
- Copidognathus bruneiensis Chatterjee, Marshall & Pešić, 2012
- Copidognathus bruuni Newell, 1967
- Copidognathus bunofer Bartsch, 1984
- Copidognathus caelatus Bartsch, 1994
- Copidognathus calidictyotus Bartsch & Rybakova, 2015
- Copidognathus caloglossae Proches, 2002
- Copidognathus canaliculifer Bartsch, 1994
- Copidognathus cataphractus (Trouessart, 1899)
- Copidognathus caudani (Trouessart, 1896)
- Copidognathus caudatus Newell, 1947
- Copidognathus caulifer (Trouessart, 1899)
- Copidognathus celatus Bartsch, 1979
- Copidognathus cephalocanthus Bartsch, 1992
- Copidognathus cerberoideus Bartsch, 1991
- Copidognathus chilensis Newell, 1984
- Copidognathus coalescens Newell, 1984
- Copidognathus commatops Newell, 1984
- Copidognathus confusus Newell, 1984
- Copidognathus consobrinus Bartsch, 1991
- Copidognathus cooki Bartsch, 2003
- Copidognathus corallicolus Chatterjee, De Troch & Chang, 2006
- Copidognathus corallorum (Trouessart, 1899)
- Copidognathus corneatus Newell, 1971
- Copidognathus coronatus Makarova, 1972
- Copidognathus costipora Newell, 1984
- Copidognathus crassirostris (Trouessart, 1901)
- Copidognathus crassispinus Bartsch, 1994
- Copidognathus cribellus Bartsch, 1993
- Copidognathus cribosoma (Police, 1909)
- Copidognathus cristatus Viets, 1936
- Copidognathus crusoei Newell, 1971
- Copidognathus crypticus Newell, 1984
- Copidognathus culoatus Bartsch, 1999
- Copidognathus cumberlandi Newell, 1971
- Copidognathus curassaviensis Viets, 1936
- Copidognathus curiosus Bartsch, 1982
- Copidognathus curtus Hall, 1912

=== D–F ===
- Copidognathus dactyloporus Benfatti, Mari & Morselli, 1989
- Copidognathus daguilarensis Bartsch, 1997
- Copidognathus dentatus Viets, 1940
- Copidognathus dentipes Bartsch, 1989
- Copidognathus derjugini Sokolov, 1952
- Copidognathus dianae Newell, 1951
- Copidognathus diaphaneus Newell, 1951
- Copidognathus dictyotellus Bartsch, 1998
- Copidognathus dictyotus Bartsch, 1993
- Copidognathus dissimilis Bartsch, 2013
- Copidognathus ditadii Pepato & Tiago, 2005
- Copidognathus dubiosus Bartsch, 1994
- Copidognathus eblingi Chatterjee, 1991
- Copidognathus elaboratus Bartsch, 1997
- Copidognathus elongatus Sokolov, 1952
- Copidognathus emblematus Otto, 2001
- Copidognathus euryalus Bartsch, 1997
- Copidognathus extensus Viets, 1940
- Copidognathus fabricii (Lohmann, 1889)
- Copidognathus facetus Bartsch, 1999
- Copidognathus falcifer Viets, 1940
- Copidognathus faubeli Bartsch, 1986
- Copidognathus felicis Newell, 1971
- Copidognathus fernandezi Newell, 1971
- Copidognathus festivus Bartsch, 1984
- Copidognathus ficipacus Bartsch, 1992
- Copidognathus figeus Bartsch, 1976
- Copidognathus fistulosus Chatterjee & Chang, 2005
- Copidognathus floridensis Newell, 1947
- Copidognathus floridus Trouessart, 1914
- Copidognathus foveatellus Bartsch, 1997
- Copidognathus foveolatus Newell, 1984
- Copidognathus frondipes Newell, 1984
- Copidognathus frontispinus Bartsch, 1972
- Copidognathus fungiae Chatterjee, De Troch & Chang, 2006
- Copidognathus fungiformis Makarova, 1974

=== G–I ===
- Copidognathus ganglionatus Newell, 1984
- Copidognathus gasconi (Gil & Garzon, 1979)
- Copidognathus gazii Chatterjee & De Troch, 2000
- Copidognathus gibberipes Viets, 1936
- Copidognathus gibboides Bartsch, 1977
- Copidognathus gibbus (Trouessart, 1889)
- Copidognathus gigas Newell, 1951
- Copidognathus gitae Chatterjee, 1991
- Copidognathus glandulifer Bartsch, 1996
- Copidognathus glandulosus Bartsch, 1984
- Copidognathus glareus Newell, 1984
- Copidognathus globulosus Makarova, 1974
- Copidognathus glyptoderma (Trouessart, 1888)
- Copidognathus gorbunovi Sokolov, 1946
- Copidognathus gracilipalpis Sokolov, 1952
- Copidognathus gracilis Viets, 1936
- Copidognathus gracilunguis Bartsch, 1992
- Copidognathus grandiculus Bartsch, 1977
- Copidognathus grandiosus Bartsch, 1984
- Copidognathus granosus Newell, 1984
- Copidognathus granulatus (Hodge, 1863)
- Copidognathus graveolus (Monniot F., 1962)
- Copidognathus greeni Chatterjee, 1999
- Copidognathus gulatus Newell, 1984
- Copidognathus gurjanovae Sokolov, 1952
- Copidognathus gurui Chatterjee & Pesic, 2014
- Copidognathus guttatus Bartsch, 1977
- Copidognathus hartmanni Bartsch, 1972
- Copidognathus hartwigi Bartsch, 1979
- Copidognathus hawaiiensis Bartsch, 1989
- Copidognathus hephaestios Benfatti, Mari & Morselli, 1992
- Copidognathus humerosus (Trouessart, 1896)
- Copidognathus hummelincki Viets, 1936
- Copidognathus hureaui Newell, 1984
- Copidognathus hylandi Bartsch, 1979
- Copidognathus ilsebartschi MacQuitty, 1984
- Copidognathus imitator Newell, 1951
- Copidognathus incarinatus Newell, 1984
- Copidognathus inconspicuus Bartsch, 1991
- Copidognathus infaustus Makarova, 1972
- Copidognathus inflatus Makarova, 1977
- Copidognathus inflexus Viets, 1952
- Copidognathus intermedius Makarova, 1977
- Copidognathus inusitatus Bartsch, 1989
- Copidognathus isopunctatus Bartsch, 1972
- Copidognathus ivanomorsellii Chatterjee & De Troch, 2003

=== J–L ===
- Copidognathus jejuensis Chatterjee & Chang, 2004
- Copidognathus johnstoni (Womersley, 1937)
- Copidognathus kagamili Newell, 1950
- Copidognathus kenyae Chatterjee & DeTroch, 2000
- Copidognathus keralensis Chatterjee, 2000
- Copidognathus kerguelensis (Lohmann, 1907)
- Copidognathus koreanus Chatterjee & Chang, 2003
- Copidognathus krantzi Chatterjee, 1992
- Copidognathus kurilensis Makarova, 1972
- Copidognathus kussakini Makarova, 1972
- Copidognathus laevisetosus Chatterjee, Lee & Chang, 2004
- Copidognathus laeviusculus Bartsch, 1993
- Copidognathus lamelliger Sokolov, 1952
- Copidognathus lamelloides Bartsch, 2000
- Copidognathus lamellosus (Lohmann, 1893)
- Copidognathus laminifer Bartsch, 1994
- Copidognathus latisetus Viets, 1940
- Copidognathus latus Viets, 1927
- Copidognathus latusculus Bartsch, 2015
- Copidognathus leiodermus Bartsch, 2004
- Copidognathus lepidoides Bartsch, 1984
- Copidognathus lepidus Bartsch, 1977
- Copidognathus leptoporus Otto, 2001
- Copidognathus leptus Bartsch, 2002
- Copidognathus levigatus Bartsch, 1999
- Copidognathus libiniensis Pepato, Santos & Tiago, 2005
- Copidognathus lineatus Bartsch, 1977
- Copidognathus lobifrons Viets, 1951
- Copidognathus lohmanni (Trouessart, 1889)
- Copidognathus longipes Bartsch, 1973
- Copidognathus longirostris (Trouessart, 1896)
- Copidognathus longispinus Bartsch & Iliffe, 1985
- Copidognathus longiunguis Bartsch, 1990
- Copidognathus loricatus (Lohmann, 1889)
- Copidognathus loricifer André, 1946
- Copidognathus lubricus Bartsch, 1986
- Copidognathus lunatus Newell, 1984
- Copidognathus lutarius Bartsch, 2003

=== M–N ===
- Copidognathus macropus Bartsch, 2009
- Copidognathus mactanus Bartsch, 1985
- Copidognathus maculatus Bartsch, 1979
- Copidognathus magnipalpus (Police, 1909)
- Copidognathus magniporus Bartsch, 1973
- Copidognathus majorinus Bartsch, 1993
- Copidognathus majusculus (Trouessart, 1894)
- Copidognathus malaysius Bartsch, 1993
- Copidognathus mangrovorum Chatterjee, Marshall & Pešić, 2012
- Copidognathus manicatus (Trouessart, 1899)
- Copidognathus manubriatus Viets, 1936
- Copidognathus marcandrei Viets, 1950
- Copidognathus matemwensis Chatterjee, De Troch & Chan, 2008
- Copidognathus matthewsi Newell, 1956
- Copidognathus megaloporus Otto, 2001
- Copidognathus menippensis Pepato, Santos & Tiago, 2005
- Copidognathus meridianus Bartsch, 2003
- Copidognathus mesomorphus André, 1959
- Copidognathus milliporus Bartsch, 1984
- Copidognathus mirus Bartsch, 1984
- Copidognathus modestus Bartsch, 1984
- Copidognathus mollis Bartsch, 2015
- Copidognathus monacanthus Bartsch, 1992
- Copidognathus mucronatus Viets, 1928
- Copidognathus multiporus Bartsch, 1994
- Copidognathus mumbaiensis Chatterjee & Chang, 2004
- Copidognathus nasutus Bartsch, 1994
- Copidognathus nautilei Bartsch, 1997
- Copidognathus nemenus Bartsch, 1984
- Copidognathus neotrichius Newell, 1984
- Copidognathus neptuneus Bartsch, 1992
- Copidognathus newelli Viets, 1956
- Copidognathus novus Bartsch, 1980
- Copidognathus nubilobius Newell, 1951
- Copidognathus obesus Bartsch, 1984
- Copidognathus oblongus Newell, 1984
- Copidognathus obsoletus André, 1938
- Copidognathus occultans Bartsch, 1991
- Copidognathus oculatus (Hodge, 1863)
- Copidognathus orarius Otto, 2001
- Copidognathus orbicularis Makarova, 1974
- Copidognathus orientalis Newell, 1951
- Copidognathus ornatus Bartsch, 1981
- Copidognathus oxianus Viets, 1928

=== P–R ===
- Copidognathus pachypus Newell, 1947
- Copidognathus pacificus Makarova, 1974
- Copidognathus paluster Bartsch, 1991
- Copidognathus papillatus Krantz, 1982
- Copidognathus parallelus (Trouessart, 1899)
- Copidognathus parapunctatus Newell, 1950
- Copidognathus parvulus Bartsch, 2007
- Copidognathus pasticus Newell, 1971
- Copidognathus pauciporus Bartsch, 1977
- Copidognathus pectinatus Newell, 1984
- Copidognathus peregrinus Bartsch, 1977
- Copidognathus pesident Bartsch, 1992
- Copidognathus philippinensis Chatterjee & De Troch, 2003
- Copidognathus piger Bartsch, 2003
- Copidognathus planus Makarova, 1974
- Copidognathus polyporus Bartsch, 1991
- Copidognathus pontellus Bartsch, 1981
- Copidognathus ponteuxinus Viets, 1928
- Copidognathus poriferus Bartsch, 1979
- Copidognathus porosus Newell, 1984
- Copidognathus posticenodosus Viets, 1951
- Copidognathus posticus Newell, 1971
- Copidognathus poucheti (Trouessart, 1893)
- Copidognathus prideauxae Otto, 2001
- Copidognathus procerus Bartsch, 2002
- Copidognathus profundus (Viets, 1936)
- Copidognathus prolixus Newell, 1984
- Copidognathus propinquus Newell, 1951
- Copidognathus psammobius Bartsch, 2008
- Copidognathus pseudofigeus Bartsch, 1977
- Copidognathus pseudosetosus Newell, 1949
- Copidognathus pseudosidellus Chatterjee, 1997
- Copidognathus pujadus Chatterjee & De Troch, 2003
- Copidognathus pulchellus (Sokolov, 1952)
- Copidognathus pulcher (Lohmann, 1893)
- Copidognathus pumicatus Bartsch, 1999
- Copidognathus punctatissimus (Gimbel, 1919)
- Copidognathus punctatus Newell, 1950
- Copidognathus punctellus Bartsch, 1994
- Copidognathus pygmaeus Bartsch, 1980
- Copidognathus quadratus Makarova, 1972
- Copidognathus quadricostatus (Trouessart, 1894)
- Copidognathus quadriporosus Chatterjee & Chang, 2006
- Copidognathus raekor Bartsch, 1973
- Copidognathus rasilis Bartsch, 1999
- Copidognathus remipes (Trouessart, 1894)
- Copidognathus reticulatus (Trouessart, 1893)
- Copidognathus rhodostigma (Gosse, 1855)
- Copidognathus rhombognathoides Bartsch, 2006
- Copidognathus richardi (Trouessart, 1902)
- Copidognathus riguus Bartsch, 2015
- Copidognathus rombus Makarova, 1978
- Copidognathus rostatellus Bartsch, 1986
- Copidognathus rostratus (Trouessart, 1899)

=== S–U ===
- Copidognathus sambhui Chatterjee, 1991
- Copidognathus scitus Bartsch, 1977
- Copidognathus sculptus (Police, 1909)
- Copidognathus scuna Otto, 1994
- Copidognathus scutellus Bartsch, 1995
- Copidognathus seductus Otto, 2000
- Copidognathus semilunatus Newell, 1984
- Copidognathus septentrionalis (Halbert, 1915)
- Copidognathus setilatus Bartsch, 2001
- Copidognathus sidellus Bartsch, 1985
- Copidognathus sideus Bartsch, 1982
- Copidognathus sigillatus Newell, 1984
- Copidognathus similis Newell, 1951
- Copidognathus simonis (Lohmann, 1907)
- Copidognathus simplipes Newell, 1984
- Copidognathus sinuosus Newell, 1971
- Copidognathus sophiae Pepato & Tiago, 2006
- Copidognathus speciosus (Lohmann, 1893)
- Copidognathus spinifer MacQuitty, 1984
- Copidognathus spinula (Trouessart, 1899)
- Copidognathus squarrosus Otto, 2000
- Copidognathus stevcici Bartsch, 1976
- Copidognathus strictulus Bartsch, 1997
- Copidognathus strigellus Bartsch, 1994
- Copidognathus styracifer Newell, 1951
- Copidognathus subgibbus Newell, 1971
- Copidognathus subneotrichius Newell, 1984
- Copidognathus subterraneus Bartsch & Iliffe, 1985
- Copidognathus suezensis André, 1959
- Copidognathus tabellio (Trouessart, 1894)
- Copidognathus tamoiorum Pepato & Tiago, 2005
- Copidognathus tectiporus (Viets, 1935)
- Copidognathus tectirostris Bartsch, 1979
- Copidognathus temaeus Bartsch, 1992
- Copidognathus tenuirostris Bartsch, 1977
- Copidognathus tetrarhachis Chatterjee & Chang, 2006
- Copidognathus thailandicus Chatterjee & Chang, 2002
- Copidognathus thomasi Newell, 1950
- Copidognathus thompsoni Otto, 2000
- Copidognathus transversus Newell, 1984
- Copidognathus triareolatus Newell, 1984
- Copidognathus tricorneatus (Viets, 1938)
- Copidognathus tridentatus Viets, 1951
- Copidognathus triops Viets, 1936
- Copidognathus triton Newell, 1971
- Copidognathus tritoni Bartsch, 2013
- Copidognathus trouessarti (Voinov, 1896)
- Copidognathus tuberans Newell, 1984
- Copidognathus tuberipes Bartsch, 1977
- Copidognathus tupinamborum Pepato & Tiago, 2006
- Copidognathus umbonatus Bartsch, 1992
- Copidognathus unalaskensis Newell, 1951
- Copidognathus ungujaensis Chatterjee, De Troch & Chang, 2006
- Copidognathus uniareolatus Newell, 1971
- Copidognathus uniscutatus Bartsch, 1984
- Copidognathus unispinosus Bartsch, 1989
- Copidognathus ushakovi Sokolov, 1952

=== V–Z ===
- Copidognathus vagus Makarova, 1977
- Copidognathus vanhoeffeni (Lohmann, 1907)
- Copidognathus ventriscutatus Bartsch, 1989
- Copidognathus venustus Bartsch, 1977
- Copidognathus vicinus Bartsch, 1997
- Copidognathus viridulus Bartsch, 2009
- Copidognathus vulcanis Newell, 1951
- Copidognathus vulgaris Bartsch, 1998
- Copidognathus wadjemupis Bartsch, 1999
- Copidognathus waltairensis Chatterjee & Annapurna, 2002
- Copidognathus xaixaiensis Proches, 2002
- Copidognathus ypsilophorus Newell, 1984
- Copidognathus yucatanensis Chatterjee & DeTroch, 2001
- Copidognathus zanzibari (Gimbel, 1919)
