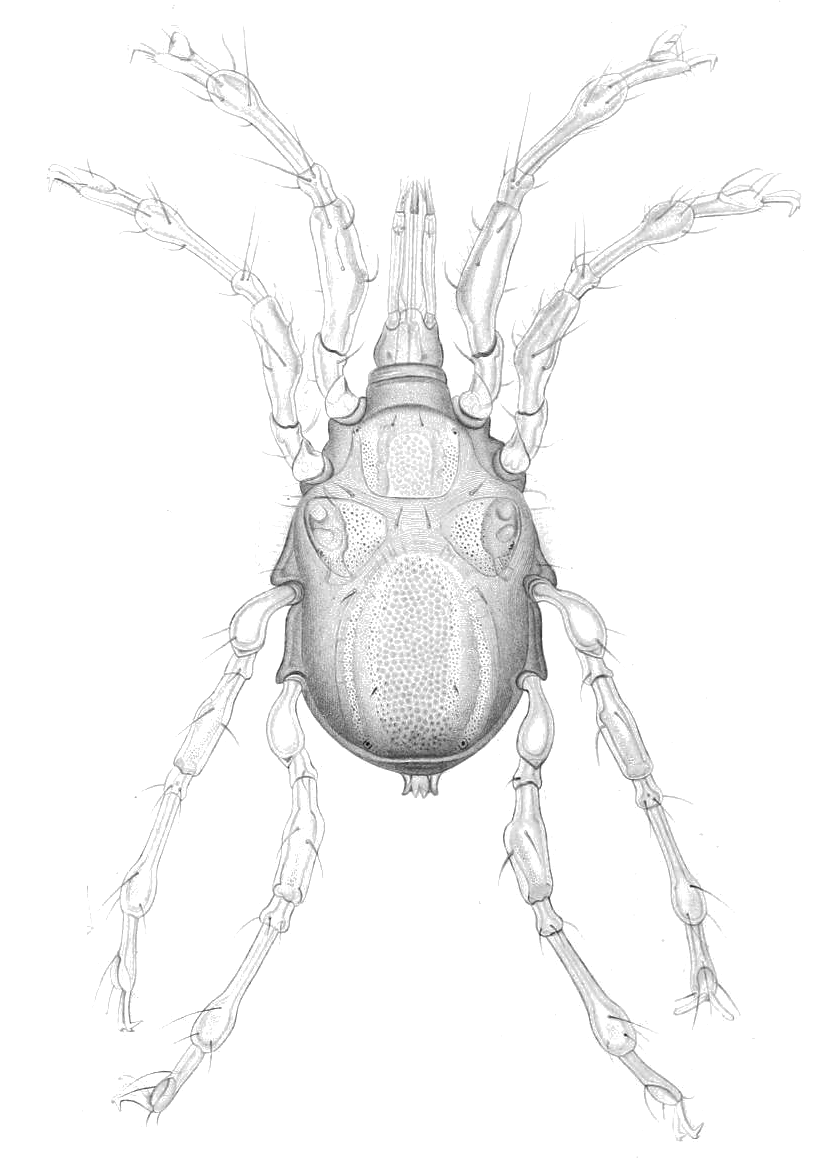
- Agaue chevreuxi - Dorsal view of Agaue chevreuxi (Acari: Hapacaridae). The specimen captured near Sidney.

Scientific classification
- Kingdom: Animalia
- Phylum: Arthropoda
- Subphylum: Chelicerata
- Class: Arachnida
- Order: Trombidiformes
- Family: Halacaridae
- Genus: Agaue; Lohmann, 1889

= Agaue (mite) =

Genus of mites

Agaue is a genus of arachnids in the family Halacaridae. There are at least four described species in Agaue.

== Species ==
- Agaue chevreuxi (Trouessart, 1889)
- Agaue hamiltoni Womersley, 1937
- Agaue magellanica Newell, 1971
- Agaue marginata Viets, 1950
