= Piip Volcano =

Submarine volcano in the Bering Sea

Coordinates: 55°26′N 167°20′E

The Piip Volcano (Volkan Pipya) is a submarine volcano in the Bering Sea, located to the east of Kamchatka Peninsula, Russia. It is the northernmost hydrothermal region in the Pacific. Its age dates back to the late Miocene - early Pliocene.

Summit height is -300 m / - 984 ft. Its current status is normal or dormant (1 out of 5)

No historic eruptions are known from Piip Volcano. Geological evidence (tephrochronology) points at one or more eruptions in 5050 BC.

== Fauna ==
The Piip Volcano was discovered during the cruise of the RV Vulkanolog in 1984. Subsequent investigations have shown it to be rich in fauna, 130 species of macro- and megafauna having been found, of which ~25% are new to science. Among the species found were the bivalve mollusk Calyptogena pacifica (Vesicomyidae: Pliocardiinae) and the gastropod Parvaplustrum wareni (Parvaplustridae). Also found on the Piip volcano are extensive bacterial mats.
