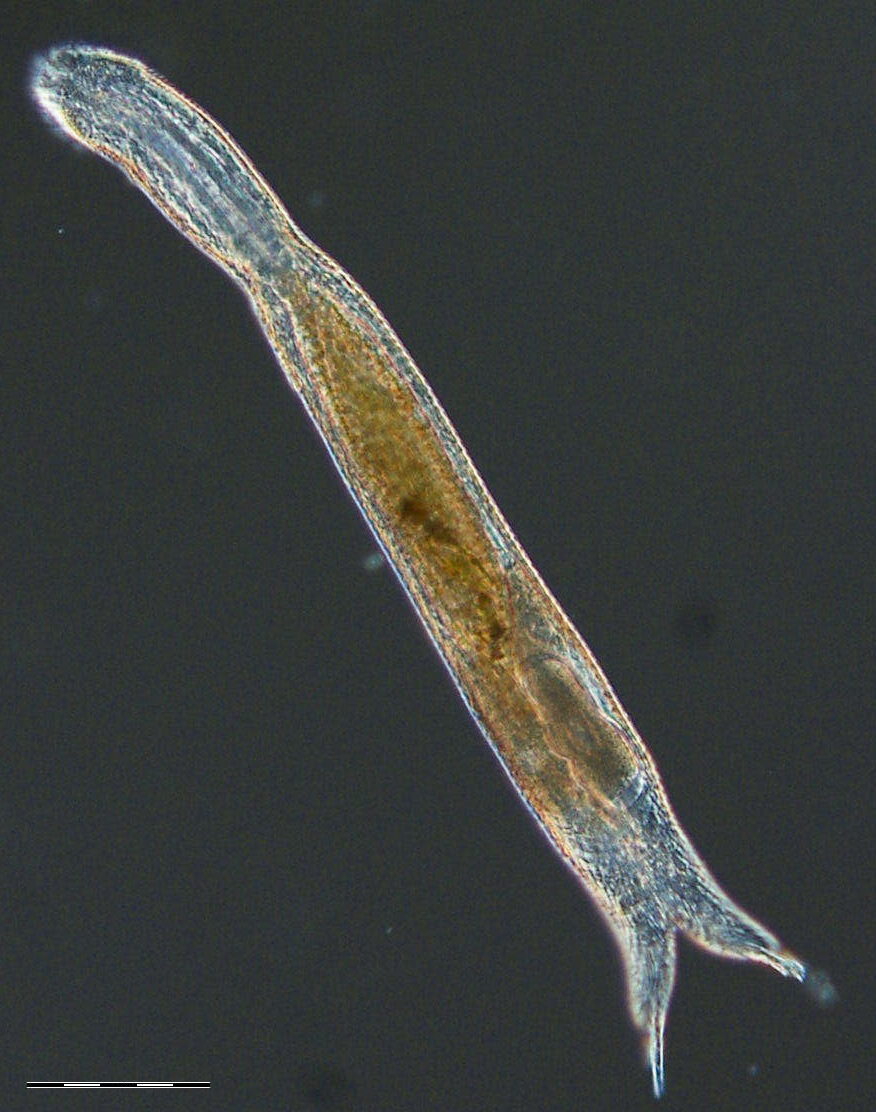
- Diuronotus aspetos

Scientific classification
- Kingdom: Animalia
- Phylum: Gastrotricha
- Order: Chaetonotida
- Family: Muselliferidae
- Genus: Diuronotus; Todaro, Balsamo & Kristensen, 2005

= Diuronotus =

Genus of gastrotrichs

Diuronotus is a genus of gastrotrichs belonging to the family Muselliferidae.

The species of this genus are found in Scandinavia and Greenland.

Species:

- Diuronotus aspetos Todaro, Balsamo & Kristensen, 2005
- Diuronotus rupperti Todaro, Balsamo & Kristensen, 2005
