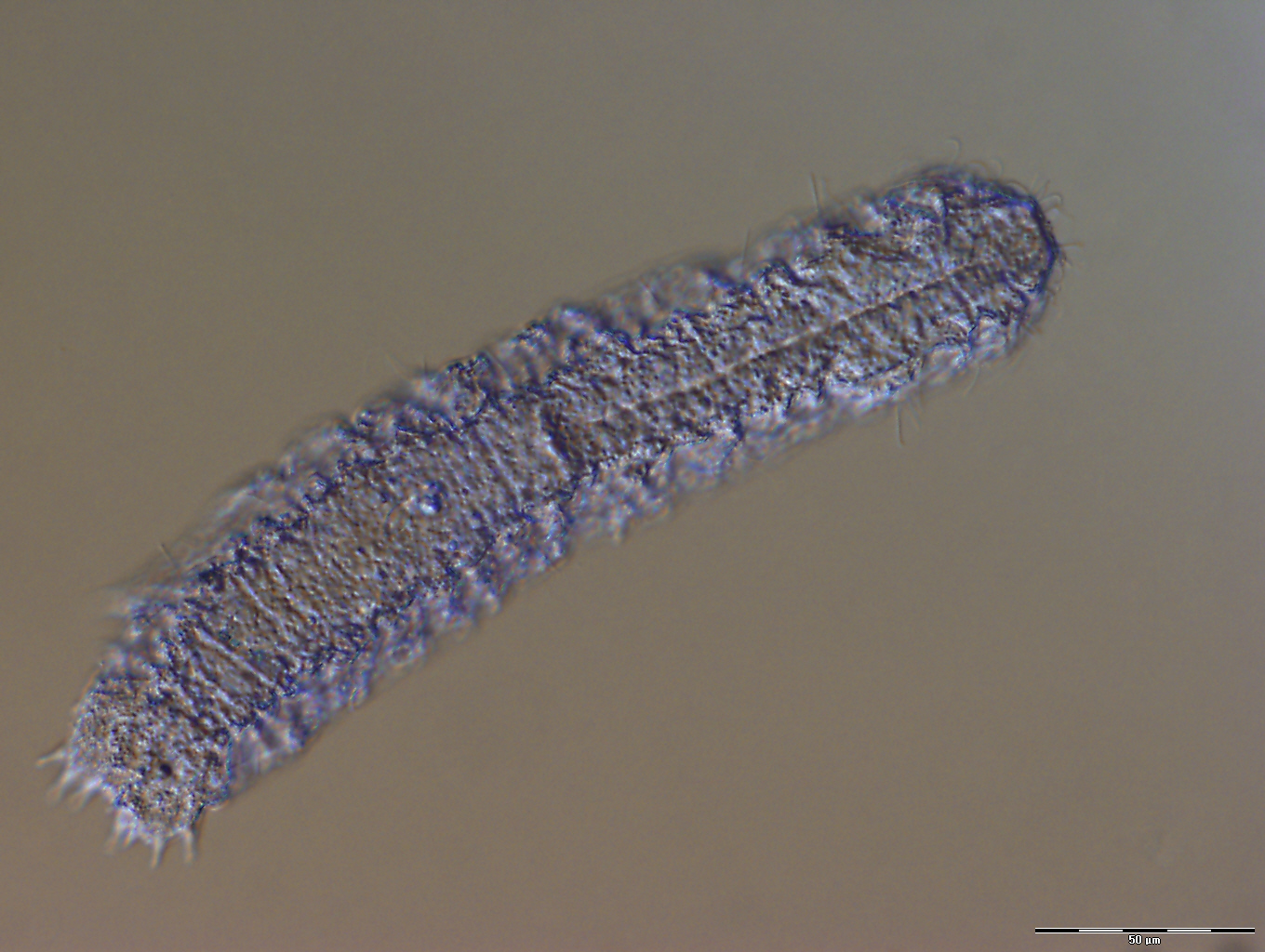
- Paradasys subterraneus

Scientific classification
- Kingdom: Animalia
- Phylum: Gastrotricha
- Order: Macrodasyida
- Family: Cephalodasyidae
- Genus: Paradasys; Remane, 1934

= Paradasys =

Genus of gastrotrichs

Paradasys is a genus of gastrotrichs belonging to the family Cephalodasyidae.

The species of this genus are found in Northern Europe, India.

Species:

- Paradasys bilobocaudus Hummon, 2008
- Paradasys hexadactylus Karling, 1954
- Paradasys lineatus Rao, 1980
- Paradasys littoralis Rao & Ganapati, 1968
- Paradasys nipponensis Sudzuki, 1976
- Paradasys pacificus Schmidt, 1974
- Paradasys subterraneus Remane, 1934
