= Mesodasys =

Scientific classification
- Kingdom: Animalia
- Phylum: Gastrotricha
- Order: Macrodasyida
- Family: Cephalodasyidae
- Genus: Mesodasys; Remane, 1951

Genus of gastrotrichs

Mesodasys is a genus of gastrotrichs belonging to the family Cephalodasyidae.

The species of this genus are found in Europe.

Species:

- Mesodasys adenotubulatus Hummon, Todaro & Tongiorgi, 1993
- Mesodasys brittanica Hummon, 2008
- Mesodasys hexapodus Rao & Ganapati, 1968
- Mesodasys ischiensis Hummon, Todaro & Tongiorgi, 1993
- Mesodasys laticaudatus Remane, 1951
- Mesodasys littoralis Remane, 1951
- Mesodasys rupperti Hummon, 2008
- Mesodasys saddlebackensis Hummon, 2010
