= Musellifer =

Scientific classification
- Kingdom: Animalia
- Phylum: Gastrotricha
- Order: Chaetonotida
- Family: Muselliferidae
- Genus: Musellifer; Hummon, 1969

Genus of gastrotrichs

Musellifer is a genus of gastrotrichs belonging to the family Muselliferidae.

The species of this genus are found in Northern America.

Species:

- Musellifer delamarei (Renaud-Mornant, 1968)
- Musellifer leasiae Sørensen, Araújo, Macheriotou, Braeckman, Smith & Ingels, 2025
- Musellifer profundus Vivier, 1974
- Musellifer reichardti Kånneby, Atherton & Hochberg, 2014
- Musellifer sublitoralis Hummon, 1969
- Musellifer tridentatus Kånneby, Atherton & Hochberg, 2014
