= Muselliferidae =

Scientific classification
- Kingdom: Animalia
- Phylum: Gastrotricha
- Order: Chaetonotida
- Suborder: Paucitubulatina
- Family: Muselliferidae; Leasi & Todaro, 2008

Family of worms

Muselliferidae is a family of gastrotrichs belonging to the order Chaetonotida.

Genera:

- Diuronotus Todaro, Balsamo & Kristensen, 2005
- Musellifer Hummon, 1969
