= Parvaplustrum =

Scientific classification
- Kingdom: Animalia
- Phylum: Mollusca
- Class: Gastropoda
- Infraclass: Mesoneura
- Superfamily: Tjaernoeioidea
- Family: Parvaplustridae
- Genus: Parvaplustrum; Powell, 1951

Type species
- Parvaplustrum tenerum Powell, 1951

Synonyms
- Parvamplustrum (misspelling)

Genus of gastropods

Parvaplustrum is a genus of marine gastropods in the monotypic family Parvaplustridae.

Parvaplustrum had previously been classified as members of Acteonoidea, which they resemble in having bubble-like shells. Parvaplustrum is most closely related to Tjaernoeia, but they have sufficiently different morphology to be considered distinct families.

It can thrive in volcanic environments such as the Vulkan Piypa. Russian researhers studying its fatty acids have shown an insignificant role of organic matter created by photosynthesis in the nutrition of P. wareni.

Up until 2022, three types of Parvaplustrum were known. Parvaplustrum tenerum, Parvaplustrum cadieni and Parvaplustrum japonicum.

Parvaplustrum tenerum had been collected from the Falkland Islands, the Atlantic sector of the Subantarctic. The other two: Parvaplustrum japonicum and Parvaplustrum cadieni, from the North Pacific: Japan and California, respectively.

Parvaplustrum cadieni had been found in chemosynthesis-based deep-sea ecosystems which showed that this community is highly adaptable.

In 2022, a new family member was found: Parvaplustrum wareni in the northwestern Bering Sea by Russian researchers Elena M. Chaban, Dimitry M. Schepetov, Irina A. Ekimova, Ivan O. Nekhaev and Alexei V. Chеrnyshev. It was found at depths of 400–472 m. It differs from the other members by its round, ball-like shell, jaw morphology, and while the others manifest a spiral sculpture, Parvaplustrum wareni doesn't.

Harvard researcher Svetlana A. Rodkina went on to study the fatty acid profile of Paraplustrum wareni found at the Piip Volcano. She found that the organic matter created by chemosynthesis provides a favorable basis for the Paraplustrum wareni population to thrive in hydrothermal vents.

== Species ==
- Parvaplustrum cadieni Á. Valdés, Gosliner & Warén, 2017
- † Parvaplustrum glaciale (Wilckens, 1910)
- Parvaplustrum japonicum Chaban & Chernyshev, 2013
- Parvaplustrum tenerum A. W. B. Powell, 1951
- Parvaplustrum wareni Chaban, Schepetov, Ekimova, Nekhaev & Chernyshev, 2022
