= Tjaernoeia =

Scientific classification
- Kingdom: Animalia
- Phylum: Mollusca
- Class: Gastropoda
- Infraclass: Mesoneura
- Superfamily: Tjaernoeioidea
- Family: Tjaernoeiidae; Warén, 1991
- Genus: Tjaernoeia; Warén & Bouchet, 1988

Type species
- Fossarus monterosati Grillo, 1877

Genus of gastropods

Tjaernoeia is a genus of sea snails in the heterobranch clade Mesoneura. They are named after the marine laboratory at Tjärnö, Strömstad, Sweden. Their shells are rounded, thin and translucent.

== Species ==
There are four species of Tjaernoeia. Two of them are found in the Bohuslän region of Sweden: Tjaernoeia exquisita and Tjaernoeia unisulcata. Tjaernoeia boucheti can be found in Scandinavia and in Iceland. Tjaernoeia michaeli has been found in Antarctica and Brazil.

It was found in Scottish waters in 1988 (as Tornus exquisitus).

In 2025, Spanish researchers found Tjaernoeia outside the Spanish and Catalan coast of these two types: the lower heterobranch Rhodope salviniplaweni sp. nov. and the nudibranch Embletonia mediterranea sp. nov.

Tjaernoeia is the only genus in the family Tjaernoeiidae. Their closest relatives are Parvaplustridae, with which they are classified in the superfamily Tjaernoeioidea. When the genus Tjaernoeia was first named, for a species previously included in Fossarus, it was tentatively classified in Pyramidellidae.

== Species ==
Species in the genus Tjaernoeia include:

- Tjaernoeia boucheti Warén, 1991 - from deep water in the northeastern Atlantic It has a smooth or almost smooth protoconch.
- Tjaernoeia exquisita (Jeffreys, 1883) - described from Crete, also known from Ghana
- Tjaernoeia michaeli Engl, 2002
- Tjaernoeia unisulcata (Chaster, 1897)
