= Cephalodasyidae =

Scientific classification
- Kingdom: Animalia
- Phylum: Gastrotricha
- Order: Macrodasyida
- Family: Cephalodasyidae; Hummon & Todaro, 2010

Family of gastrotrichs

Cephalodasyidae is a family of gastrotrichs belonging to the order Macrodasyida.

Genera:

- Cephalodasys Remane, 1926
- Pleurodasys Remane, 1927
