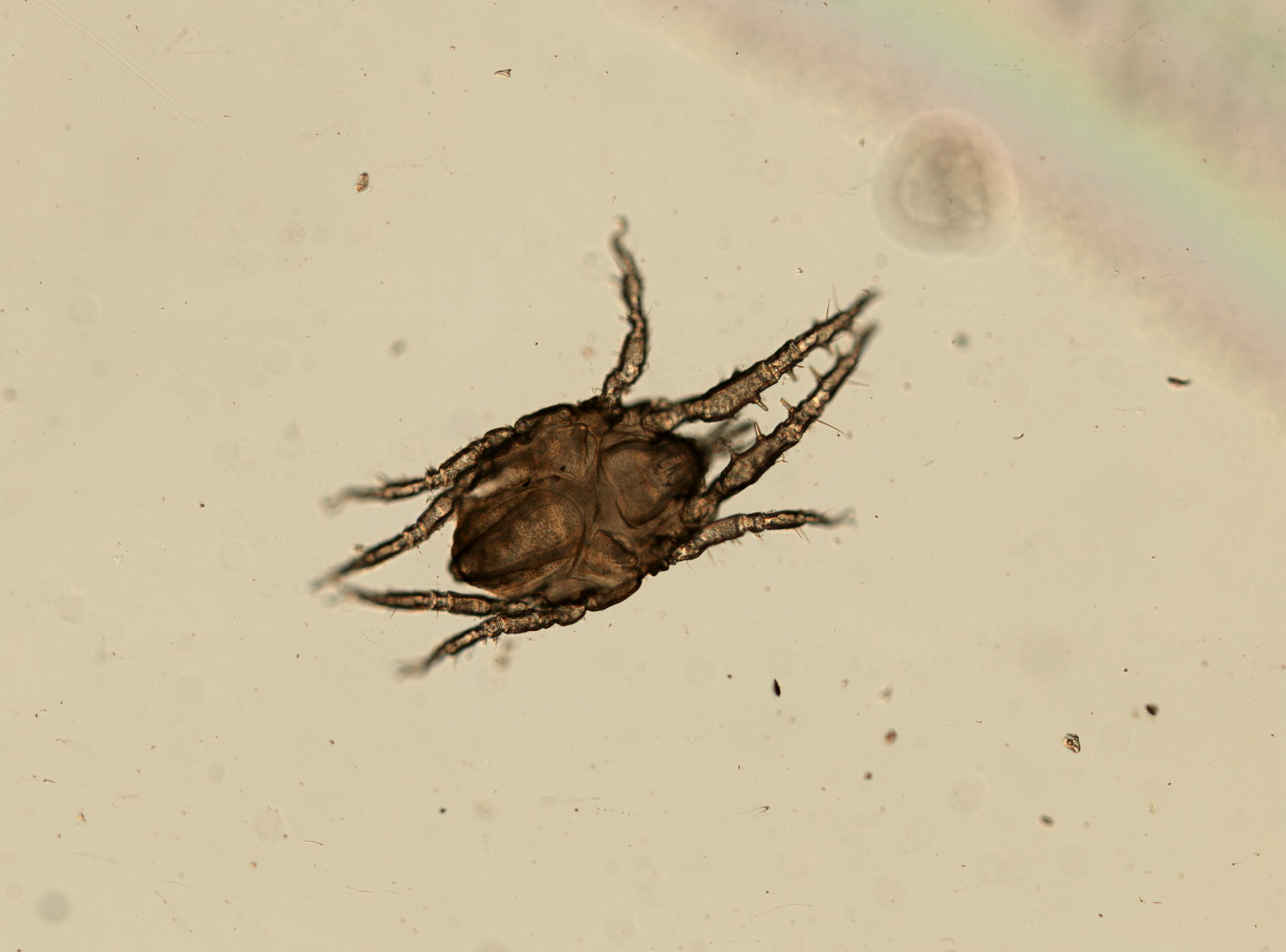
- Agauopsis brevipalpus

Scientific classification
- Kingdom: Animalia
- Phylum: Arthropoda
- Subphylum: Chelicerata
- Class: Arachnida
- Order: Trombidiformes
- Superfamily: Halacaroidea
- Family: Halacaridae; Murray, 1877

= Halacaridae =

Family of mites that is mostly marine

Halacaridae is a family of meiobenthic mites found in marine, brackish, and freshwater habitats around the world. It includes more than 1100 described species belonging to 64 genera It is the largest marine radiation of arachnids.

== Description and life cycle ==
Halacarids have four pairs of legs (as adults and nymphs; see below), of which the first two pairs point forwards and the last two pairs point backwards. This is a synapomorphy of the group. Another synapomorphy are four plates on the dorsal surface of the body, except for several genera with reduction of certain plates.

The life cycle of halacarids consists of egg, larva, one to three nymphal stages (in full, protonymph, deutonymph and tritonymph) and adult. Additionally, between each of the free-living stages (i.e. except for the egg) is a quiescent pupal stage.

- Eggs are usually deposited by an adult female in a substrate, with the help of an ovipositor.
- Larvae have three pairs of legs, with each leg five-segmented, and lack a genital plate.
- Protonymphs have four pairs of legs (as do all following stages), of which the fourth pair is five-segmented, and they usually have a distinct genital plate.
- Deutonymphs and tritonymphs have each leg six-segmented.
- Adults are often similar to the last nymphal stage, but they have an ovipositor (if female) or spermatopositor (if male).

Like mites in general, halacarids have a pair of palps. The palps usually have four segments each, but they are three-segmented in Simognathus and just two-segmented in Acaromantis.

Halacarids of subfamily Copidognathinae have just a single nymphal stage. Additionally, the number of genital papillae is reduced to a single pair.

The subfamily Rhombognathinae, which is algivorous, can be recognised by the dark green or almost black pigment inside their digestive system. This pigment is partially digested chlorophyll from algae.

== Ecology ==
Halacaridae occur in various habitats including sandy beaches, tidal sediment, interstitial spaces, hydrothermal vents, mangroves, salt marshes and on larger animals. They spend their entire lives on a substrate such as attached algae or sand.

Most species and genera are predators, though Rhombognathinae are instead algivores. In freshwater halacarids, some species are restricted to crayfish gill chambers, implying a parasitic lifestyle, while Lobohalacarus weberi is a scavenger that feeds on dead nematodes and oligochaetes but not on live ones.

== Phylogeny ==
Recent analyses place Halacaridae as the sister group to Parasitengona. Within the group, algivorous Rhombognathinae consists of two lineages (Rhombognathus+Isobactrus and Rhombognathides+Metarhombognathus), meaning the habit of algivory has evolved two independent times.

== Genera ==
- Acanthohalacarus Bartsch, 2001
- Acanthopalpus Makarova, 1978
- Acarochelopodia Angelier, 1954
- Acaromantis Trouessart & Neumann, 1893
- Acarothrix Bartsch, 1990
- Actacarus Schulz, 1937
- Agaue Lohmann, 1889
- Agauides Bartsch, 1988
- Agauopsis Viets, 1927
- Anomalohalacarus Newell, 1949
- Arhodeoporus Newell, 1947
- Astacopsiphagus Viets, 1931
- Bathyhalacarus Sokolov & Jankovskaja, 1968
- Bradyagaue Newell, 1971
- Camactognathus Newell, 1984
- Coloboceras Trouessart, 1889
- Colobocerasides Viets, 1950
- Copidognathides Bartsch, 1976
- Copidognathus Trouessart, 1888
- Corallihalacarus Otto, 1999
- Enterohalacarus Viets, 1938
- Halacarellus Viets, 1927
- Halacaroides Bartsch, 1981
- Halacaropsis Bartsch, 1996
- Halacarus Gosse, 1855
- Halixodes Brucker & Trouessart, 1899
- Hamohalacarus Walter, 1931
- Himejacarus Imamura, 1957
- Isobactrus Newell, 1947
- Limnohalacarus Walter, 1917
- Lobohalacarus Viets, 1939
- Lohmannella Trouessart, 1901
- Metarhombognathus
- Mictognathus Newell, 1984
- Parasoldanellonyx Viets, 1929
- Parhalixodes Laubier, 1960
- Pelacarus Bartsch, 1986
- Peregrinacarus Bartsch, 1999
- Plegadognathus Morselli, 1981
- Porohalacarus Thor, 1922
- Porolohmannella Viets, 1933
- Rhombognathides Viets, 1927
- Rhombognathus Trouessart, 1888
- Ropohalacarus Bartsch, 1989
- Scaptognathides Monniot, 1972
- Scaptognathus Trouessart, 1889
- Simognathus Trouessart, 1889
- Soldanellonyx Walter, 1917
- Spongihalacarus Otto, 2000
- Stygohalacarus Viets, 1934
- Thalassacarus Newell, 1949
- Thalassarachna Packard, 1871
- Thalassophthirius Bartsch, 1988
- Troglohalacarus Viets, 1937
- Tropihalacarus Otto & Bartsch, 1999
- Werthella Lohmann, 1907
- Werthelloides Bartsch, 1986
- Winlundia Newell, 1984
- Xenohalacarus Otto, 2000
