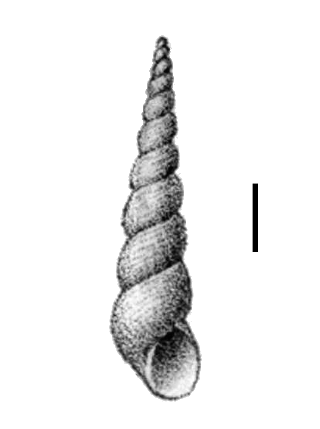
- Shell of the murchisonellid Ebala nitidissima

Scientific classification
- Domain: Eukaryota
- Kingdom: Animalia
- Phylum: Mollusca
- Class: Gastropoda
- Infraclass: Mesoneura
- Superfamily: Murchisonelloidea; Casey, 1904

Families
- See text

= Murchisonelloidea =

Superfamily of gastropods

Murchisonelloidea is an unassigned superfamily of mostly very small sea snails, marine gastropod mollusks and micromollusks within the clade Mesoneura.

== Families ==
- † Donaldinidae Bandel, 1994
- Murchisonellidae Casey, 1904

Families brought into synonymy

- Ebalidae Warén, 1995 accepted as the subfamily Ebalinae Warén, 1995
