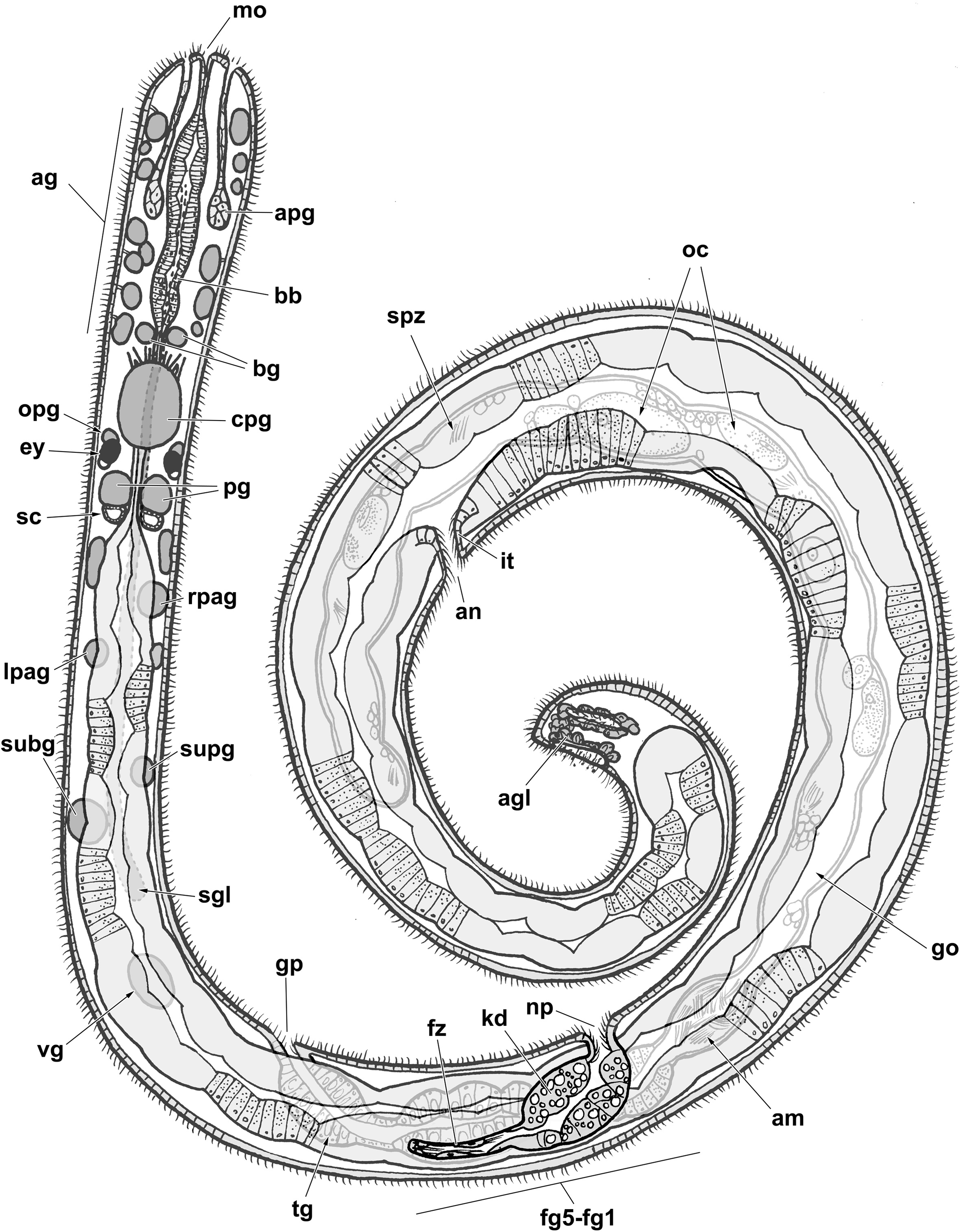
- Helminthope psammobionta dorsal view schematic

Scientific classification
- Kingdom: Animalia
- Phylum: Mollusca
- Class: Gastropoda
- Infraclass: Mesoneura
- Superfamily: Rhodopoidea
- Family: Rhodopidae; Ihering, 1876

Type genus
- Rhodope Kölliker, 1847

Genera
- Helminthope; Rhodope

= Rhodopidae =

- Live individual of Rhodope veranii

Family of gastropods

Rhodopidae is a family of sea slugs. Rhodopids are small, meiofaunal organisms with worm-like body plans that differ considerably from a typical gastropod body plan, to the point that Rhodope was at one point classified as a flatworm. They have no shell. Two genera are currently recognized within the family, Rhodope and Helminthope. Helminthope has been described as the most worm-like gastropod.

== Etymology ==
Rhodope, the type genus of the family, is named for Rhodope, a figure in Greek mythology.

== Description ==
Rhodopids have worm-like bodies with no appendages. They often have red, orange, or purple bands, in varying pattern depending on the species, though some species are entirely white. The species range in length from 1.5 to 8 mm, although they are capable of considerably contracting themselves. The length-to-width ratios of the body while extended to crawl is around 9 in Rhodope and 25 in Helminthope. Their bodies contain spicules below the epidermis that may provide structural support for the animal. The nervous system of rhodopids has accessory ganglia, as in several other lineages of interstitial gastropod.

== Ecology ==
Some rhodopid species are epibenthic, while others, particularly the genus Helminthope, are fully interstitial organisms. They are found in temperate and warm oceans worldwide.

Rhodopids are the only known predators of placozoans, which make up the primary component of their diet. At least some species, such as Rhodope placozophagus, can subsist entirely on a diet of placozoans; they are apparently not harmed by the toxins present in placozoans.

== Evolution ==
Although their affinities were long unclear, it is now known that rhodopids belong to the basal heterobranch clade Mesoneura. They are not closely related to any other lineage of sea slugs; their closest living relatives are sea snails of the family Murchisonellidae, and sea snails of the families Tjaernoeiidae and Parvaplustridae are their next-closest living relatives. Although rhodopids lack a fossil record themselves, murchisonellids have a fossil record dating back to the Triassic, suggesting that rhodopids also date back as far. They may be one of the oldest lineages of slugs. A molecular clock analysis suggested that the stem group of rhodopids may have arisen in the late Paleozoic, with an average age estimate of 281 million years ago and 95% of their age estimates falling within a range of 339 and 217 million years ago.
