= Mesoneura (gastropod) =

Scientific classification
- Kingdom: Animalia
- Phylum: Mollusca
- Class: Gastropoda
- Subclass: Heterobranchia
- Infraclass: Mesoneura; Brenzinger et al., 2021

Superfamilies
- Murchisonelloidea; Rhodopoidea; Tjaernoeioidea

Mesoneura is an infraclass of gastropods in the subclass Heterobranchia.

They are the sister group to Euthyneura, and show intermediate characteristics between lower heterobranchs and euthyneurans.

Four families are included in Mesoneura: Tjaernoeiidae, a family of minute deep-sea snails with coiled shells, Parvaplustridae, a family of deep-sea snails with bubble-like shells, Murchisonellidae, one of the most ancient families of snails, and Rhodopidae, a family of worm-like sea slugs.

Molecular clock analysis suggests that Mesoneura diverged from Euthyneura approximately 359 million years ago, with a 95% confidence interval of 406–307 million years ago. The earliest fossil murchisonellids are known from rocks dated to between 350 and 260 million years ago.
