= Vermes =

Obsolete taxon of non-arthropod invertebrates

Vermes ("vermin/vermes") is an obsolete taxon used by Carl Linnaeus and Jean-Baptiste Lamarck for non-arthropod invertebrate animals.

== Linnaeus ==
In Linnaeus's Systema Naturae, the Vermes had the rank of class, occupying the 6th (and last) slot of his animal systematics. It was divided into the following orders, all except the Lithophyta containing (in modern terms) organisms from a variety of phyla:

- Intestina, including horsehair worms, earthworms, roundworms, liver flukes, leeches, hagfishes, and shipworms
- Mollusca, including slugs, sea slugs, polychaetes, sea mice, priapulids, salps, jellyfish, starfish, and sea urchins
- Testacea, including chitons, barnacles, clams, cockles, nautiluses, snails and serpulid worms
- Lithophyta, including various corals
- Zoophyta, including bryozoans, coralline algae, Hydra, sea pens, tapeworms, and Volvox

Apart from the Mollusca, understood very differently from the modern phylum of that name, Linnaeus included a very diverse and rather mismatched assemblage of animals in the categories. The Intestina group encompassed various parasitic animals, among them the hagfish, which Linnaeus would have found in dead fish. Shelled molluscs were placed in the Testacea, together with barnacles and tube worms. Cnidarians (jellyfish and corals), echinoderms and polychaetes were spread across the other orders.

== Lamarck ==
Linnaeus's system was revised by Jean-Baptiste Lamarck in his 1801 Système des Animaux sans Vertebres. In this work, he categorized echinoderms, arachnids, crustaceans and annelids, which he separated from Vermes.

== Modern ==
After Linnaeus, and especially with the advent of Darwinism, it became apparent that the Vermes animals are not closely related. Systematic works on phyla since Linnaeus continued to split up Vermes and sort the animals into natural systematic units.

Of the classes of Vermes proposed by Linnaeus, only Mollusca has been kept as a phylum, and its composition has changed almost entirely. Linnaeus's early classification of the soft-bodied organisms was revolutionary in its day. A number of the organisms classified as Vermes by Linnaeus were very poorly known, and a number of them were not even viewed as animals.

== Vermiform ==
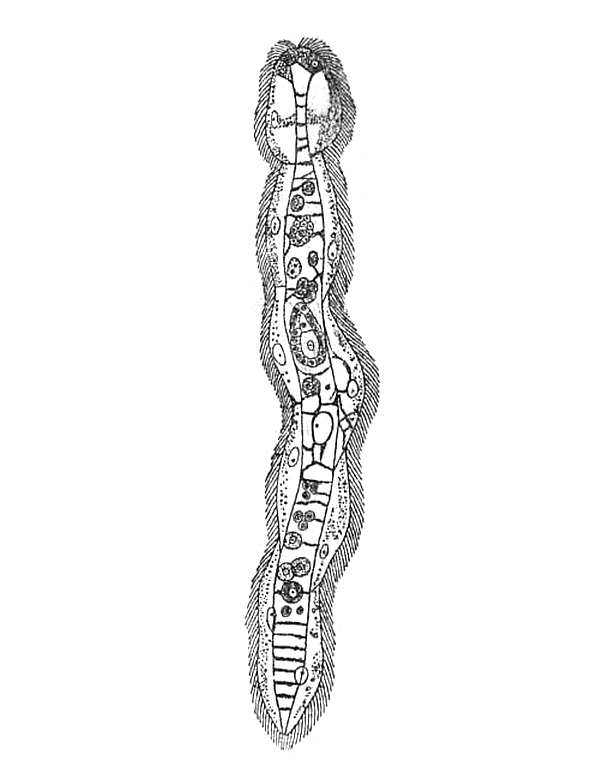
Dicyema, a small parasite described as "vermiform"

While the Vermes is no longer a taxonomic group, anatomists continue to use the description "vermiform" of animals or organs that are worm-shaped. The word root is Latin, vermes (worms) and formes (shaped). (A well known example of the same term is the vermiform appendix, a small, blind section of the gut in humans and a number of other mammals.)

Several soft-bodied animal phyla including the annelids (earthworm and relatives) and the roundworms (mainly parasites), but also the minute parasitic mesozoans and some larger-bodied free-living phyla like the ribbon worms, peanut worms, and priapulids.
