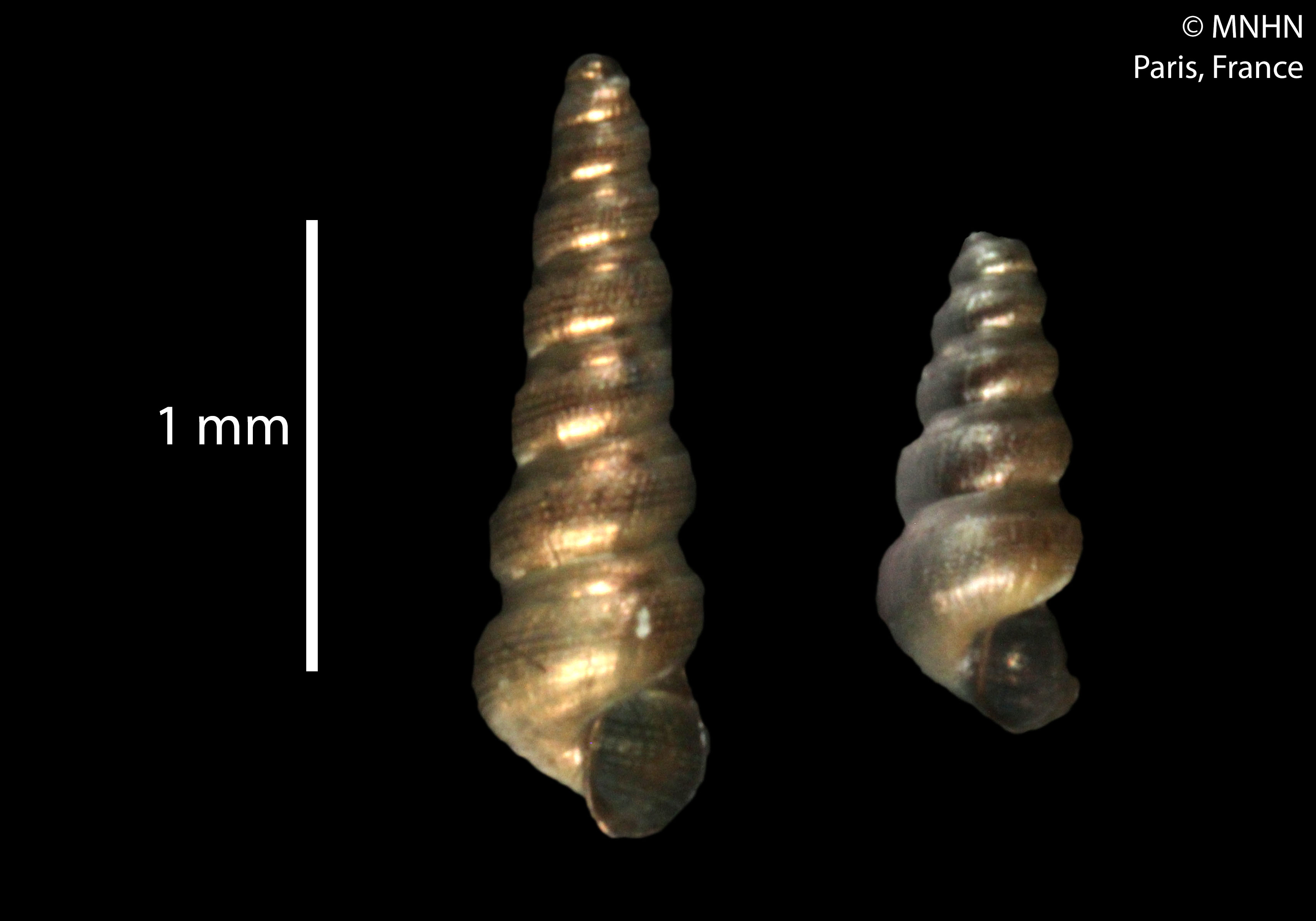

Scientific classification
- Kingdom: Animalia
- Phylum: Mollusca
- Class: Gastropoda
- Superfamily: Murchisonelloidea
- Family: Murchisonellidae; Casey, 1904

Subfamilies
- See text

Synonyms
- Ebalidae Warén, 1994

= Murchisonellidae =

Family of gastropods

Murchisonellidae is a taxonomic family of sea snails, marine opisthobranch gastropod mollusks in the superfamily Murchisonelloidea.

== Taxonomy ==
=== 1999 taxonomy ===
Under the system according to Christoffer Schander, Van Aartsen & Corgan (1999), there were five genera in the Ebalidae:

- Ebala J. E. Gray, 1847
- Bermudaclis Bartsch, 1947
- Chesapeakella Campbell, 1993
- Ebalina Thiele, 1929
- Henrya Bartsch, 1947

=== 2005 taxonomy ===
This family has no subfamilies (according to the taxonomy of the Gastropoda by Bouchet & Rocroi, 2005).

This has been changed in 2013 into two subfamilies.

== Genera ==
Genera within the family Muchisonellidae include:

Subfamily Ebalinae Warén, 1995

- Ebala Gray, 1847 - synonym: Anisocycla Monterosato, 1880

Subfamily Murchisonellinae T. L. Casey, 1904

- Henrya Bartsch, 1947
- Koloonella Laseron, 1959
- Murchisonella Mörch, 1875 - type genus
- Pseudoaclisina Yoo, 1994

Genera brought into synonymy

- Bermudaclis Bartsch, 1947: synonym of Murchisonella Mörch, 1875
- Laseronella Whitley, 1959: synonym of Murchisonella Mörch, 1875
- Murchisoniella P. Fischer, 1885: synonym of Murchisonella Mörch, 1875
- Pandorella Laseron, 1951: synonym of Murchisonella Mörch, 1875
