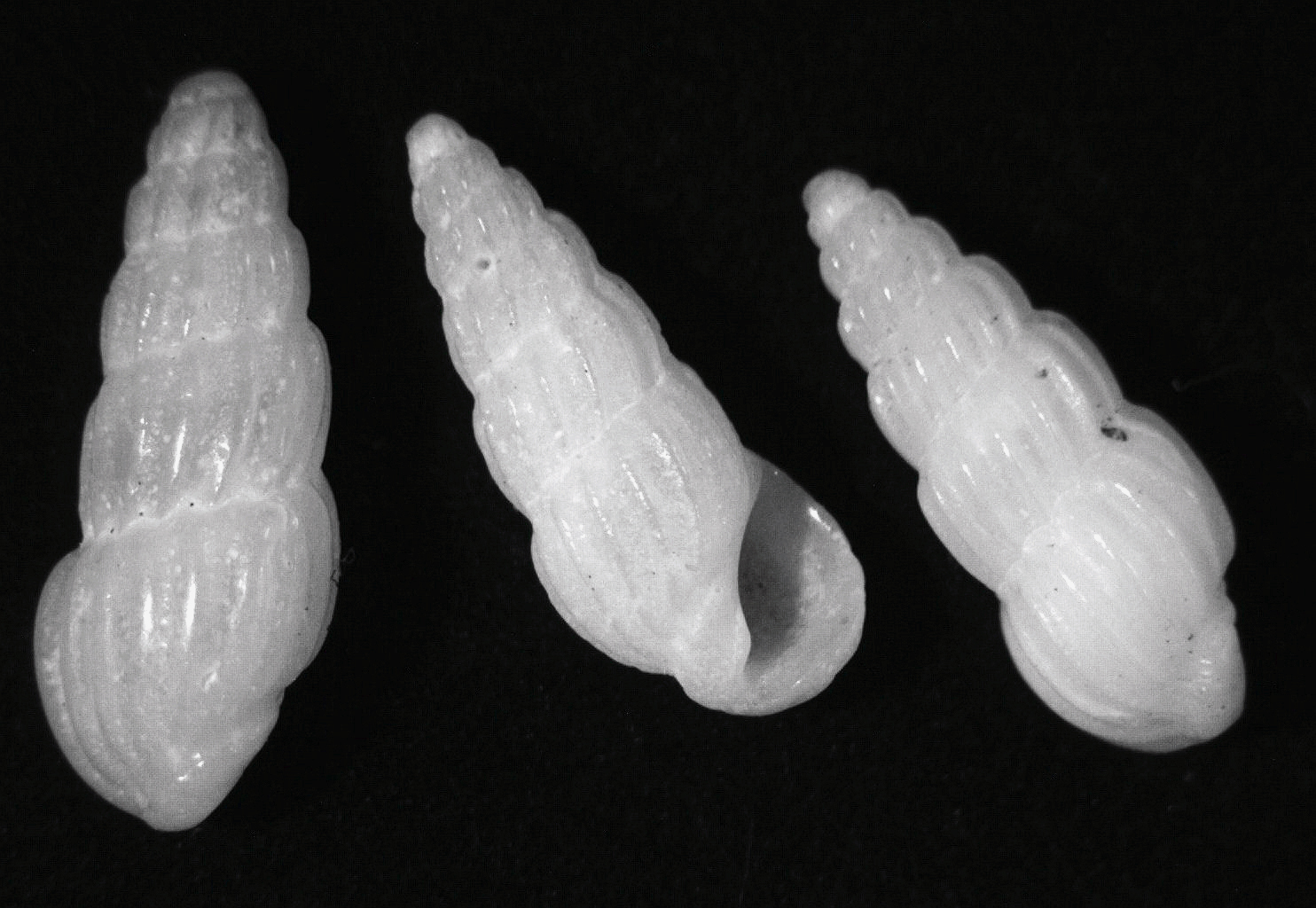
- Rissoina crassa

Scientific classification
- Kingdom: Animalia
- Phylum: Mollusca
- Class: Gastropoda
- Subclass: Caenogastropoda
- Order: Littorinimorpha
- Superfamily: Rissooidea
- Family: Rissoinidae
- Genus: Rissoina d'Orbigny, 1840

Type species
- Rissoina inca d'Orbigny, 1840

Synonyms
- Austrosina Laseron, 1956; Caporista Iredale, 1955; Condylicia Laseron, 1956; Costalynia Laseron, 1956; Fractoralla Laseron, 1956; Laseronia Cotton, 1959; Pachyrissoina Boettger, 1893; Peripetella Laseron, 1956; Rissoa (Rissoina) d'Orbigny, 1841 (original rank); Rissoina (Eurissoina) Woodring, 1928 † · unaccepted (incorrect subsequent spelling); Rissoina (Eurissolina) Woodring, 1928 · alternate representation; Rissoina (Fercurtia) Gougerot & Le Renard, 1978 † · alternate representation; Rissoina (Leaella) Cossmann, 1921 †; Rissoina (Pachyrissoina) O. Boettger, 1893; Rissoina (Rissoina) d'Orbigny, 1840; Rissoina(Rissolina) Gould, 1861; Rissolina Gould, 1861; Stiva Hedley, 1904; Zymalata Laseron, 1956

= Rissoina =

Genus of gastropods

Rissoina is a large genus of minute sea snails, marine gastropod molluscs or micromolluscs, in the family Rissoinidae.

== Species ==
According to the World Register of Marine Species (WoRMS) the following species with valid are included within the genus Rissoina :

- Rissoina achatina Odhner, 1924
- Rissoina achatinoides (Powell, 1937)
- Rissoina adamsi Bartsch, 1915
- † Rissoina ailinana Ladd, 1966
- † Rissoina alabamensis Aldrich, 1895
- Rissoina albanyana Turton, 1932
- † Rissoina albaresensis Pacaud, 2019
- † Rissoina albertensis Landes in Russell & Landes, 1940
- Rissoina alfredi Smith, 1904
- † Rissoina altenai Beets, 1942
- Rissoina ambigua (Gould, 1849)
- Rissoina andamanica Weinkauff, 1881
- Rissoina angasii Pease, 1872
- Rissoina angeli Espinosa & Ortea, 2002
- Rissoina anguina Finlay, 1926
- Rissoina angusta Preston, 1908
- Rissoina antoni Schwartz, 1860
- Rissoina applanata Melvill, 1893
- Rissoina artensis Montrouzier, 1872
- Rissoina aspera Faber, 2013
- Rissoina assimilis Jickeli, 1882
- Rissoina atimovatae Faber, 2018
- † Rissoina aturensis Cossmann & Peyrot, 1919
- Rissoina aupouria Powell, 1937
- Rissoina barbara Grabau & King, 1928
- † Rissoina barreti Morlet, 1885
- Rissoina basisulcata Faber, 2018
- Rissoina basteroti Schwartz, 1860
- Rissoina bertholleti Issel, 1869
- Rissoina bicollaris Schwartz, 1860
- † Rissoina bikiniensis Ladd, 1966
- Rissoina bilinea (Laseron, 1956)
- Rissoina birestes (Laseron, 1956)
- † Rissoina bonneti Cossmann, 1910
- Rissoina boucheti Sleurs, 1991
- Rissoina bouvieri Jousseaume, 1894
- Rissoina (Moerchiella) bozzettii Faber, 2015
- Rissoina brazieri Tenison-Woods, 1876
- † Rissoina briggsi Ladd, 1966
- Rissoina bruguieri (Payraudeau, 1826)
- †Rissoina bulimina Olsson & Harbison, 1953
- † Rissoina burdigalensis d'Orbigny, 1852
- † Rissoina bureaui Cossmann, 1919
- Rissoina bureri Grabau & King, 1928
- Rissoina caballeri Faber, 2018
- Rissoina calia Bartsch, 1915
- Rissoina canaliculata Schwartz, 1860
- Rissoina cardinalis Brazier, 1877
- † Rissoina caribella Weisbord, 1962
- Rissoina catholica Melvill & Standen, 1896
- Rissoina cerithiiformis Tryon, 1887
- Rissoina cerrosensis Bartsch, 1915
- Rissoina chathamensis (Hutton, 1873)
- † Rissoina chipolana Dall, 1892
- Rissoina cincta Angas, 1867
- † Rissoina clarksvillensis Mansfield, 1930
- † Rissoina clavula (Deshayes, 1825)
- † Rissoina cloezi Morlet, 1885
- Rissoina cochlearella (Lamarck, 1804)
- Rissoina collaxis (Laseron, 1956)
- Rissoina coronadensis Bartsch, 1915
- Rissoina coronata Schwartz, 1860
- Rissoina costata A. Adams, 1853
- Rissoina costatogranosa Garrett, 1873
- Rissoina costulata Dunker, 1860
- Rissoina costulifera Pease, 1862
- Rissoina crassa Angas, 1871
- Rissoina crassilabrum Garrett, 1857
- Rissoina crenilabris Boettger, 1893
- Rissoina cretacea Tenison-Woods, 1878
- Rissoina curtisi E. A. Smith, 1884
- Rissoina debilis Garrett, 1873
- † Rissoina debussa Woodring, 1928
- Rissoina decapitata (Laseron, 1956)
- Rissoina delicatissima Raines, 2002
- Rissoina delicatula Preston, 1905
- Rissoina denseplicata Thiele, 1925
- Rissoina deshayesi Schwartz, 1860
- Rissoina dimidiata Jickeli, 1882
- † Rissoina (Moerchiella) dimorpha Gougerot, 1968
- Rissoina dina Bartsch, 1915
- Rissoina distans d'Anton, 1839
- † Rissoina ditomus Woodring, 1928
- Rissoina dorbignyi A. Adams, 1853
- Rissoina duclosi Montrouzier & Souverbie, 1866
- Rissoina dunedini Grabau & King, 1928
- Rissoina dux (Laseron, 1956)
- Rissoina dyscrita Faber, 1990
- † Rissoina ekkanana Ladd, 1966
- † Rissoina emnanana Ladd, 1966
- Rissoina eulimoides A. Adams, 1854
- Rissoina excolpa Bartsch, 1915
- Rissoina exigua Weinkauff, 1881
- Rissoina expansa Carpenter, 1865
- † Rissoina fargoi Olsson & Harbison, 1953
- Rissoina fasciata A. Adams, 1851
- Rissoina favilla Bartsch, 1915
- Rissoina fenestrata Schwartz, 1860
- Rissoina ferruginea (Hedley, 1904)
- Rissoina fictor Finlay, 1930
- Rissoina filicostata Preston, 1905
- Rissoina fimbriata Souverbie, 1872
- Rissoina fischeri Desjardin, 1949
- Rissoina flexuosa Gould, 1861
- Rissoina fortis (C.B. Adams, 1852)
- Rissoina fratercula Sleurs & Preece, 1994
- Rissoina fucosa Finlay, 1930
- Rissoina funiculata Souverbie, 1866
- Rissoina gemmea Hedley, 1899
- Rissoina gertrudis Tenison-Woods, 1876
- Rissoina gigantea (Deshayes, 1848)
- Rissoina gisna Bartsch, 1915
- † Rissoina giuntellii Zunino & Pavia, 2009
- † Rissoina goikulensis Ladd, 1966
- Rissoina gracilis Garrett, 1873
- † Rissoina grateloupi (Basterot, 1825)
- † Rissoina guppyi Cossmann, 1921
- Rissoina guttulata Faber, 2013
- Rissoina hanleyi Schwartz, 1860
- Rissoina harryleei Rolán & Fernández-Garcés, 2009
- Rissoina hartmanni Jordan, 1935
- Rissoina helena Bartsch, 1915
- Rissoina hernandezi Faber & Gori, 2016
- Rissoina heronensis (Laseron, 1956)
- Rissoina herosae Paulmier, 2017
- † Rissoina herringi Ladd, 1966
- † Rissoina hoheneggeri Ascher, 1906
- Rissoina honoluluensis Watson, 1886
- † Rissoina houdasi Cossmann, 1892
- Rissoina hummelincki Jong & Coomans, 1988
- Rissoina humpa (Chang & Wu, 2004)
- Rissoina illustris G. B. Sowerby III, 1894
- Rissoina imbricata Gould, 1861
- Rissoina inca d'Orbigny, 1840
- Rissoina incerta Souverbie, 1872
- Rissoina indica G. Nevill, 1885
- Rissoina indiscreta Leal and Moore, 1989
- Rissoina inermis Brazier, 1877
- Rissoina io Bartsch, 1915
- Rissoina iredalei Laseron, 1950
- Rissoina irregularis Faber, 2018
- Rissoina isolata (Laseron, 1956)
- Rissoina isosceles Melvill & Standen, 1903
- Rissoina jaffa Cotton, 1952
- Rissoina jeffreysiensis Tomlin, 1931
- Rissoina jickelii Weinkauff, 1881
- † Rissoina jirikana Ladd, 1966
- † Rissoina johnsoni Dall, 1892
- † Rissoina jonkeri Koperberg, 1931
- † Rissoina juncea Gardner, 1947
- Rissoina keenae Smith & Gordon, 1948
- Rissoina kilburni Sleurs, 1993
- Rissoina krebsii (Mörch, 1876)
- Rissoina labrosa Schwartz, 1860
- † Rissoina lamellosa (Desmoulins, 1836)
- † Rissoina lanotensis Lozouet, 2011
- Rissoina larochei Finlay, 1930
- † Rissoina lata Traub, 1981
- Rissoina laurae de Folin, 1870
- Rissoina liletae Poppe, Tagaro & Stahlschmidt, 2015
- Rissoina limicola Faber, 2013
- † Rissoina liriope Olsson & Harbison, 1953
- † Rissoina lomaloana Ladd, 1966
- Rissoina longispira Sleurs, 1991
- Rissoina longistriata Paulmier, 2017
- Rissoina lutaoi Chang & Wu, 2004
- Rissoina lyrata Gould, 1861
- Rissoina madagascariensis Faber, 2018
- Rissoina maduparensis Beets, 1986 †
- Rissoina maestratii Faber, 2013
- Rissoina manawatawhia Powell, 1937
- † Rissoina (Moerchiella) manzakiana Yokoyama, 1922
- Rissoina mayori Dall, 1927
- Rissoina mazatlanica Bartsch, 1915
- † Rissoina mejilana Ladd, 1966
- Rissoina melanelloides Baker, Hanna & Strong, 1930
- Rissoina mercurialis Watson, 1886
- Rissoina meteoris Gofas, 2007
- Rissoina mexicana Bartsch, 1915
- Rissoina micans A. Adams, 1851
- Rissoina millecostata Garrett, 1873
- Rissoina mirjamae Faber & Gori, 2016
- † Rissoina mississippiensis Meyer, 1886
- Rissoina modesta Gould, 1861
- Rissoina monilifera G. Nevill, 1885
- Rissoina monilis A. Adams, 1851
- Rissoina montagui Weinkauff, 1881
- Rissoina multicostata (C. B. Adams, 1850)
- Rissoina multilineata Turton, 1932
- Rissoina myosoroides Récluz in Schwartz, 1864
- Rissoina nelsoni Grabau & King, 1928
- Rissoina neptis Faber, 2013
- Rissoina nevilliana Weinkauff, 1881
- Rissoina nielseni (Laseron, 1950)
- Rissoina nitida A. Adams, 1851
- Rissoina nivea A. Adams, 1853
- Rissoina obeliscus Schwartz, 1860
- Rissoina okinawensis Sleurs, 1993
- † Rissoina oolitensis Faber, 2017
- Rissoina opalia Faber, 2013
- Rissoina otohimeae Kosuge, 1965
- Rissoina oryza Garrett, 1873
- Rissoina ovalis (Chang & Wu, 2004)
- Rissoina pachystoma Melvill, 1896
- Rissoina parkeri Olsson & Harbison, 1953
- Rissoina peaseana Weinkauff, 1881
- Rissoina pellucida Preston, 1905
- Rissoina peninsularis Bartsch, 1915
- Rissoina percrassa G. Nevill & H. Nevill, 1874
- † Rissoina pleistocena Bartsch, 1915
- Rissoina plicata A. Adams, 1853
- Rissoina plicatula Gould, 1861
- † Rissoina polita (Deshayes, 1825)
- Rissoina powelli Finlay, 1930
- Rissoina praecida (Laseron, 1956)
- Rissoina privati (Folin, 1867)
- Rissoina pseudoprinceps Weinkauff, 1884
- Rissoina pulchella Brazier, 1877
- Rissoina punctatissima Tate, 1899
- † Rissoina puncticulata Deshayes, 1861
- Rissoina punctostriata (Talavera, 1975)
- † Rissoina puntagordana Weisbord, 1962
- Rissoina pusilla Brocchi
- † Rissoina pygmaea Cossmann, 1888
- Rissoina pyramidalis A. Adams, 1851
- † Rissoina pyrgus Woodring, 1928
- Rissoina quasillus Melvill & Standen, 1896
- Rissoina quasimodo Faber, 2013
- † Rissoina raincourti Cossmann, 1885
- Rissoina redferni Espinosa & Ortea, 2002
- Rissoina registomoides Melvill & Standen, 1903
- Rissoina rhyllensis Gatliff & Gabriel, 1908
- † Rissoina rilebana Ladd, 1966
- Rissoina rissoi Weinkauff, 1885 ex Audouin
- † Rissoina rituola Woodring, 1928
- Rissoina robini Paulmier, 2017
- Rissoina royana (Iredale, 1924)
- Rissoina sagraiana (d'Orbigny, 1842)
- Rissoina scalariana A. Adams, 1853
- Rissoina scalariformis (C.B. Adams, 1852)
- Rissoina sceptrumregis Melvill & Standen, 1901
- Rissoina schubelae Sleurs & Preece, 1994
- Rissoina scolopax Souverbie, 1877
- Rissoina sculptilis Garrett, 1873
- Rissoina sculpturata Preston, 1908
- † Rissoina semidecussata Boettger, 1901
- † Rissoina semistriata (Lamarck, 1804)
- Rissoina simplicissima Thiele, 1925
- Rissoina sismondiana Issel, 1869
- Rissoina smithi Angas, 1867
- Rissoina sorror Sleurs, 1994
- Rissoina spiralis Souverbie, 1866
- Rissoina spirata Sowerby G.B. I, 1820
  - Rissoina spirata montrouzieri (Souverbie, 1862 in Souverbie & Montrouzier, 1859–79)
- Rissoina striata (Quoy & Gaimard, 1833)
- Rissoina stricta (Menke, 1850)
- Rissoina strigillata Gould, 1861
- † Rissoina sturanii Zunino & Pavia, 2009
- † Rissoina subagathostoma Gougerot & Le Renard, 1978
- Rissoina subconcinna Souverbie in Souverbie & Montrouzier, 1872
- Rissoina subdebilis Weinkauff, 1881
- Rissoina subfuniculata Weinkauff, 1881
- †Rissoina submercurialis Yokoyama, 1920
- Rissoina subulina Weinkauff, 1881
- Rissoina subvillica Weinkauff, 1881
- Rissoina sundaica Thiele, 1925
- Rissoina taiwanica Chang & Wu, 2004
- Rissoina tenuistriata Pease, 1868<
- Rissoina terebra Garrett, 1873
- Rissoina thatcheria Chang & Wu, 2004
- Rissoina tibicen Melvill, 1912
- Rissoina tongunensis Wen-Der Chen, 2008
- Rissoina tornatilis Gould, 1861
- Rissoina torresiana (Laseron, 1956)
- Rissoina townsendi Bartsch, 1915
- Rissoina triangularis Watson, 1886
- † Rissoina tricarinata Morris & Lycett, 1851
- † Rissoina trilirata P. J. Fischer, 1921
- Rissoina tumidula Lycett, 1863 †
- Rissoina tutongensis Harzhauser, Raven & Landau, 2018 †
- Rissoina usitata Laseron, 1950
- Rissoina vanderspoeli Jong & Coomans, 1988
- Rissoina vangoethemorum Sleurs, 1994
- Rissoina variegata Angas, 1867
- Rissoina villica Gould, 1861
- Rissoina vincentiana Cotton, 1952
- † Rissoina vittata Gardner, 1947
- Rissoina walkeri E. A. Smith, 1893
- † Rissoina waluensis Ladd, 1966
- Rissoina weinkauffiana Nevill, 1881
- Rissoina woodmasoniana G. Nevill, 1885
- Rissoina zeltneri (de Folin, 1867)
- Rissoina zonata Suter, 1909
- Rissoina zonula Melvill & Standen, 1896

The Indo-Pacific Moluscan Database also includes many more species with names in current use

Subgenus Phosinella

- Rissoina burdigalensis d'Orbigny, 1852
- Rissoina dunkeriana (Kuroda & Habe in Habe, 1961)

Subgenus Rissoina

- Rissoina perpusilla Nevill, 1884
- Rissoina rosea (Deshayes, 1863)

== Synonyms ==
- † Rissoina abbotti Ladd, 1966: synonym of † Zebinella abbotti (Ladd, 1866)
- Rissoina abnormis G. Nevill & H. Nevill, 1875: synonym of Stosicia abnormis (G. Nevill & H. Nevill, 1875)
- Rissoina abrardi (Ladd, 1966): synonym of Ailinzebina abrardi (Ladd, 1966)
- Rissoina adamsiana Weinkauff, 1881: synonym of Zebina adamsiana (Weinkauff, 1881)
- Rissoina affinis Garrett, 1873: synonym of Zebinella tenuistriata (Pease, 1868)
- Rissoina alarconi Hertlein & Strong, 1951: synonym of Zebinella alarconi (Hertlein & A. M. Strong, 1951)
- † Rissoina alexisi Ladd, 1966: synonym of Phosinella digera (Laseron, 1956) (junior synonym)
- Rissoina allanae Laseron, 1950: synonym of Phosinella allanae (Laseron, 1950)
- Rissoina allemani Bartsch, 1931: synonym of Zebinella allemani (Bartsch, 1931)
- † Rissoina ame Woodring, 1928: synonym of † Zebinella ame (Woodring, 1928)
- Rissoina angulata (Laseron, 1956): synonym of Zebinella angulata (Laseron, 1956)
- Rissoina angusta (Laseron, 1956): synonym of Pyramidelloides angustus (Hedley, 1898)
- Rissoina annulata Dunker, 1859: synonym of Stosicia annulata (Dunker, 1859)
- Rissoina annulata Hutton, 1884: synonym of Eatoniella olivacea (Hutton, 1882)
- Rissoina axelliana Hertlein & Strong, 1951: synonym of Zebina axeliana (Hertlein & Strong, 1951)
- Rissoina baculumpastoris Melvill & Standen, 1896: synonym of Pyramidelloides baculumpastoris (Melvill & Standen, 1896)
- Rissoina bakeri Bartsch, 1915: synonym of Schwartziella bakeri (Bartsch, 1902)
- Rissoina barthelowi Bartsch, 1915: synonym of Zebinella barthelowi (Bartsch, 1915)
- Rissoina bellardii Issel, 1869: synonym of Pyramidelloides mirandus (A. Adams, 1861)
- Rissoina bellula A. Adams, 1851: synonym of Phosinella bellula (A. Adams, 1851)
- Rissoina bermudensis Peile, 1926: synonym of Schwartziella bryerea (Montagu, 1803)
- Rissoina berryi Baker, Hanna & Strong, 1930: synonym of Couthouyella menesthoides (Carpenter, 1864)
- Rissoina bilabiata Boettger, 1893: synonym of Schwartziella bilabiata (Boettger, 1893)
- Rissoina birestes (Laseron, 1956): synonym of Rissoina plicatula Gould, 1861
- Rissoina bougei Bavay, 1917: synonym of Stosicia bougei (Bavay, 1917)
- Rissoina browniana (d'Orbigny, 1842): synonym of Zebina browniana (d'Orbigny, 1842)
- Rissoina bruguierei (Payraudeau, 1826): synonym of Rissoina bruguieri (Payraudeau, 1826)
- Rissoina bryerea (Montagu, 1803): synonym of Schwartziella bryerea (Montagu, 1803)
- Rissoina burragei Bartsch, 1915: synonym of Schwartziella burragei (Bartsch, 1915)
- Rissoina caelata (Laseron, 1956): synonym of Rissoina striata (Quoy & Gaimard, 1833)
- Rissoina californica Bartsch, 1915: synonym of Schwartziella californica (Bartsch, 1915)
- Rissoina cancellata Philippi, 1847: synonym of Phosinella cancellata (Philippi, 1847)
- Rissoina cancellina Rolán & Fernández-Garcés, 2010: synonym of Phosinella cancellina (Rolán & Fernández-Garcés, 2010) (Phosinella accepted as full genus)
- Rissoina carpentariensis Hedley, 1912: synonym of Iravadia carpentariensis (Hedley, 1912)
- Rissoina castaneogramma Garrett, 1873: synonym of Phosinella castaneogramma (Garrett, 1873)
- Rissoina clandestina (C. B. Adams, 1852): synonym of Schwartziella clandestina (C. B. Adams, 1852)
- Rissoina clathrata A. Adams, 1853: synonym of Phosinella clathrata (A. Adams, 1853)
- Rissoina cleo Bartsch, 1915: synonym of Schwartziella cleo (Bartsch, 1915)
- † Rissoina cochlearina Meunier in Meunier & Lambert, 1880 : synonym of † Zebinella cochlearina (Meunier, 1880)
- Rissoina columen Melvill, 1904: synonym of Chevallieria columen (Melvill, 1904)
- Rissoina concinna (Laseron, 1956): synonym of Rissoina evanida G. Nevill & H. Nevill, 1874
- Rissoina congenita E. A. Smith, 1890: synonym of Schwartziella congenita (E. A. Smith, 1890)
- Rissoina conica (C. B. Adams, 1850): synonym of Vitreolina conica (C. B. Adams, 1850)
- Rissoina conifera Montagu, 1803: synonym of * Phosinella conifera (Montagu, 1803)
- † Rissoina constantinensis Cossmann & Pissarro, 1902: synonym of † Zebinella constantinensis (Cossmann & Pissarro, 1902)
- Rissoina costatogranosa Garrett, 1873: synonym of Phosinella costatogranosa (Garrett, 1873)
- Rissoina costulata Pease, 1867: synonym of Rissoina cerithiiformis Tryon, 1887
- Rissoina coulthardi Webster, 1908: synonym of Nozeba emarginata (Hutton, 1885)
- Rissoina cyatha (Laseron, 1956): synonym of Phosinella cyatha (Laseron, 1956)
- Rissoina cylindrica Bozzetti, 2009: synonym of Rissoina (Moerchiella) bozzettii Faber, 2015: synonym of Moerchiella bozzettii (Faber, 2015)
- Rissoina cylindracea Tenison Woods, 1878: synonym of Epigrus cylindraceus (Tenison Woods, 1878)
- Rissoina decipiens E. A. Smith, 1890: synonym of Schwartziella bryerea (Montagu, 1803)
- Rissoina decussata (Montagu, 1803): synonym of Zebinella decussata (Montagu, 1803)
- Rissoina deshayesiana (Récluz, 1843): synonym of Phosinella deshayesiana (Récluz, 1843)
- Rissoina decipiens (Laseron, 1956): synonym of Schwartziella bryerea (Montagu, 1803)
- Rissoina decussata (Montagu, 1803): synonym of Zebinella decussata (Montagu, 1803)
- † Rissoina decussata var. planata Dall, 1892: synonym of † Zebinella planata (Dall, 1892)
- Rissoina detrita Boettger, 1893: synonym of Rissoina dorbignyi A. Adams, 1851
- Rissoina dimidiata Jickeli, 1882: synonym of Rissoina dorbignyi A. Adams, 1851
- Rissoina digera (Laseron, 1956): synonym of Phosinella digera (Laseron, 1956)
- Rissoina efficata Brazier, 1877: synonym of Rissoina antoni Schwartz, 1860
- Rissoina effusa Mörch, 1860: synonym of Schwartziella effusa (Mörch, 1860)
- † Rissoina eleonorae Boettger, 1901: synonym of Zebinella eleonorae (Boettger, 1901)
- Rissoina elevata (Laseron, 1956): synonym of Phosinella elevata (Laseron, 1956)
- Rissoina elegantissima (d'Orbigny, 1842): synonym of Ailinzebina elegantissima (d'Orbigny, 1842)
- Rissoina elegantula Angas, 1880 : synonym of Zebinella elegantula (Angas, 1880)
- Rissoina elspethae Melvill, 1910: synonym of Chevallieria columen (Melvill, 1904)
- Rissoina emina (Laseron, 1956): synonym of Phosinella emina (Laseron, 1956)
- Rissoina enteles Melvill & Standen, 1896: synonym of Rissoina imbricata Gould, 1861
- Rissoina ephamella (Watson, 1886) sensu Laseron, 1956: synonym of Schwartziella ephamilla (Watson, 1886)
- Rissoina ephamilla (Watson, 1886): synonym of Schwartziella ephamilla (Watson, 1886)
- Rissoina ericana Hertlein & Strong, 1951: synonym of Folinia ericana (Hertlein & Strong, 1951)
- Rissoina eucosmia Bartsch, 1915: synonym of Pyramidelloides mirandus (A. Adams, 1861)
- Rissoina evanida Nevill, 1874: synonym of Zebinella evanida (G. Nevill & H. Nevill, 1881)
- Rissoina exasperata Souverbie, 1866: synonym of Phosinella exasperata (Souverbie, 1866)
- Rissoina expansa Carpenter, 1865 non Deshayes, 1861: synonym of Zebinella dilatata (Faber, 2017)
- Rissoina firmata (C. B. Adams, 1852): synonym of Schwartziella firmata (C. B. Adams, 1852)
- Rissoina floridana Olsson, A.A. & A. Harbison, 1953: synonym of Schwartziella floridana (Olsson, A.A. & A. Harbison, 1953)
- Rissoina gemmea Hedley, 1899: synonym of Phosinella gemmea (Hedley, 1899)
- Rissoina gemmulata Turton, 1932: synonym of Pyramidelloides mirandus (A. Adams, 1861)
- Rissoina harperi Dautzenberg & Bouge, 1933: synonym of Rissoina cerithiiformis Tryon, 1887
- Rissoina hedleyi Tate, 1899: synonym of Stosicia hedleyi (Tate, 1899)
- Rissoina helenae E. A. Smith, 1890: synonym of Schwartziella helenae (E. A. Smith, 1890)
- † Rissoina heterolira Laws, 1941: synonym of † Zebinella heterolira (Laws, 1941)
- Rissoina histia Bartsch, 1915: synonym of Folinia histia (Bartsch, 1915)
- Rissoina horrida Garrett, 1873: synonym of Costabieta horrida (Garrett, 1873)
- Rissoina hungerfordiana Weinkauff, 1881: synonym of Phosinella hungerfordiana (Weinkauff, 1881)
- Rissoina hystrix Souverbie, 1877: synonym of Pyramidelloides mirandus (A. Adams, 1861)
- Rissoina infratincta (Garrett, 1873): synonym of Phosinella infratincta (Garrett, 1873)
- Rissoina insolita Deshayes, 1863: synonym of Pyramidelloides mirandus (A. Adams, 1861)
- Rissoina interfossa P. P. Carpenter, 1864: synonym of Lirobittium interfossa (P. P. Carpenter, 1864)
- Rissoina janus (C.B. Adams, 1852): synonym of Zebinella janus (C. B. Adams, 1852)
- Rissoina japonica Weinkauff, 1881: synonym of Zebina japonica (Weinkauff, 1881)
- Rissoina kesteveni Hedley, 1907: synonym of Herewardia kesteveni (Hedley, 1907)
- Rissoina laeta Preston, 1908: synonym of Rissoina artensis Montrouzier, 1872
- Rissoina laevicostulata Pilsbry, 1904: synonym of Rissoina plicatula Gould, 1861
- Rissoina lamberti Souverbie, 1870: synonym of Rissoina antoni Schwartz, 1860
- Rissoina lankaensis Preston, 1905: synonym of Rissoina antoni Schwartz, 1860
- Rissoina lapazana Bartsch, 1915: synonym of Lirobarleeia kelseyi (Dall & Bartsch, 1902)
- † Rissoina lepida Woodring, 1928 : synonym of † Mirarissoina lepida (Woodring, 1928)
- Rissoina leucophanes Tomlin, 1931: synonym of Schwartziella leucophanes (Tomlin, 1931)
- Rissoina lirata (Carpenter, 1857): synonym of Lirobarleeia lirata (Carpenter, 1857)
- Rissoina lowei Strong, 1938: synonym of Lirobarleeia kelseyi (Dall & Bartsch, 1902)
- Rissoina media Schwartz, 1860: synonym of Phosinella media (Schwartz, 1860)
- † Rissoina mijana Ladd, 1966 : synonym of † Zebinella mijana (Ladd, 1866)
- Rissoina miltozona Tomlin, 1915: synonym of Rissoina cerithiiformis Tryon, 1887; synonym of Apataxia cerithiiformis (Tryon, 1887)
- † Rissoina minuta (Gabb, 1873): synonym of † Zebinella minuta (Gabb, 1873)
- Rissoina minutissima Tenison Woods, 1878: synonym of Pseudorissoina perexiguus (Tate & May, 1900)
- Rissoina mirabilis Weinkauff, 1881: synonym of Stosicia mirabilis (Weinkauff, 1881)
- Rissoina miranda A. Adams, 1861: synonym of Pyramidelloides mirandus (A. Adams, 1861)
- Rissoina moellendorffi O. Boettger, 1893: synonym of Zebinella moellendorffi (Boettger, 1893)
- Rissoina mohrensterni Deshayes, 1863: synonym of Zebinella mohrensterni (Deshayes, 1863)
- Rissoina montrouzieri Souverbie, 1862: synonym of Rissoina dorbignyi A. Adams, 1851
- Rissoina multicostata (Garrett, 1857): synonym of Rissoina costulifera Pease, 1862
- Rissoina nereina Bartsch, 1915: synonym of Schwartziella nereina (Bartsch, 1915)
- Rissoina nesiotes Melvill & Standen, 1896: synonym of Rissoina spiralis Souverbie, 1866
- Rissoina newcombei Dall, 1897: synonym of Schwartziella newcombei (Dall, 1897)
- Rissoina nitida A. Adams, 1853: synonym of Phosinella nitida (A. Adams, 1853)
- Rissoina nodicincta A. Adams, 1853: synonym of Phosinella nodicincta (A. Adams, 1853)
- Rissoina olivacea (Hutton, 1884): synonym of Eatoniella olivacea (Hutton, 1882)
- † Rissoina oncera Woodring, 1957: synonym of † Phosinella oncera (Woodring, 1957)
- Rissoina onobiformis Rolán & Luque, 2000: synonym of Ailinzebina onobiformis (Rolán & Luque, 2000)
- Rissoina orbignyi: synonym of Rissoina dorbignyi A. Adams, 1851
- Rissoina oscitans Preston, 1905: synonym of Iravadia delicata (Philippi, 1849)
- Rissoina paenula (Laseron, 1956): synonym of Phosinella paenula (Laseron, 1956)
- Rissoina paschalis Melvill & Standen, 1901: synonym of Stosicia paschalis (Melvill & Standen, 1901)
- Rissoina perita Sleurs, 1992: synonym of Rissoina evanida (Laseron, 1956)
- Rissoina phormis Melvill, 1904: synonym of Phosinella phormis (Melvill, 1904)
- Rissoina polytropa Hedley, 1899: synonym of Stosicia mirabilis (Weinkauff, 1881)
- Rissoina porteri Baker, Hanna & Strong, 1930: synonym of Schwartziella ephamilla (Watson, 1886)
- Rissoina preposterum (Berry, 1958): synonym of Zebina preposterum (Berry, 1958)
- Rissoina princeps (C. B. Adams, 1850): synonym of Zebinella princeps (C. B. Adams, 1850)
- Rissoina pseudoconcinna Nevill, 1885: synonym of Stosicia mirabilis (Weinkauff, 1881)
- Rissoina pseudoescalaris Melvill & Standen, 1901: synonym of Opalia pseudoescalaris (Melvill & Standen, 1901)
- Rissoina pulchra (C. B. Adams, 1850): synonym of Phosinella pulchra (C. B. Adams, 1850)
- Rissoina pura (Gould, 1861): synonym of Phosinella pura (Gould, 1861)
- Rissoina refugium Melvill, 1918: synonym of Chiliostigma refugium (Melvill, 1918)
- Rissoina retecosa Thiele, 1925: synonym of Phosinella retecosa (Thiele, 1925)
- Rissoina reticulataG.B. Sowerby I, 1824: synonym of Moerchiella reticulata (G. B. Sowerby I, 1833) (Moerchiella accepted as genus)
- Rissoina rex Pilsbry, 1904: synonym of Mormula rex (Pilsbry, 1904)
- Rissoina samoensis Weinkauff, 1881: synonym of Stosicia abnormis (G. Nevill & H. Nevill, 1875)
- Rissoina scabra Garrett, 1873: synonym of Phosinella scabra (Garrett, 1873)
- Rissoina schmackeri Boettger, 1887: synonym of Phosinella schmackeri (Boettger, 1887)
- Rissoina seguenziana Issel, 1869: synonym of Phosinella seguenziana (Issel, 1869)
- Rissoina semisculpta Tate, 1899: synonym of Rissoina antoni Schwartz, 1860
- Rissoina sigmifer Mörch, 1876: synonym of Zebinella sigmifer (Mörch, 1876)
- Rissoina signae Bartsch, 1915: synonym of Folinia signae (Bartsch, 1915)
- Rissoina smithii Tryon, 1887: synonym of Eatoniella caliginosa (E. A. Smith, 1875)
- Rissoina sincera Melvill & Standen, 1896: synonym of Phosinella sincera (Melvill & Standen, 1896)
- Rissoina stephensae Baker, Hanna & Strong, 1930 : synonym of Diala stephensae (Baker, Hanna & Strong, 1930)
- Rissoina striatocostata (d'Orbigny, 1842): synonym of Zebinella striatocostata (d'Orbigny, 1842)
- Rissoina striatula Pease, 1867: synonym of Rissoina imbricata Gould, 1861
- Rissoina striolata A. Adams, 1851: synonym of Moerchiella striolata (A. Adams, 1853)
- Rissoina striosa (C. B. Adams, 1850): synonym of Zebinella striosa (C. B. Adams, 1850)
- Rissoina sumatrensis Thiele, 1925: synonym of Phosinella sumatrensis (Thiele, 1925)
- Rissoina supracostata Garrett, 1873: synonym of Rissoina artensis Montrouzier, 1872
- Rissoina teres Brazier, 1877: synonym of Phosinella teres (Brazier, 1877)
- Rissoina thaumasia Melvill & Standen, 1898: synonym of Rissoina antoni Schwartz, 1860
- Rissoina tomlini Bavay, 1917: synonym of Ailinzebina tomlini (Bavay, 1917)
- Rissoina townsendi Bartsch, 1915: synonym of Zebinella townsendi (Bartsch, 1915)
- Rissoina triticea Pease, 1861: synonym of Schwartziella triticea (Pease, 1861)
- Rissoina trochlearis Gould, 1861: synonym of Stosicia annulata (Dunker, 1859)
- Rissoina truncata (Laseron, 1956) : synonym of Pandalosia subfirmata (O. Boettger, 1887)
- Rissoina turricula Pease, 1860: synonym of Rissoina costata A. Adams, 1851
- Rissoina turrita (Garrett, 1873): synonym of Tomlinella insignis (Adams & Reeve, 1850)
- Rissoina turtoni E. A. Smith, 1890: synonym of Schwartziella turtoni (E. A. Smith, 1890)
- Rissoina ultima (Laseron, 1956): synonym of Phosinella ultima (Laseron, 1956)
- Rissoina vanpeli De Jong & Coomans, 1988: synonym of Schwartziella vanpeli (De Jong & Coomans, 1988)
- Rissoina viaderi Tomlin, 1939: synonym of Pyramidelloides angustus (Hedley, 1898)
- Rissoina villica Gould, 1861: synonym of Rissoina antoni Schwartz, 1860
- Rissoina warnefordiae Preston, 1908: synonym of Phosinella warnefordiae (Preston, 1908)
- Rissoina woodwardii Carpenter, 1857: synonym of Schwartziella woodwardii (Carpenter, 1857)
- Rissoina yendoi Yokoyama, 1927: synonym of Iravadia yendoi (Yokoyama, 1927)
- Rissoina zeltneri (de Folin, 1867): synonym of Zebinella zeltneri (de Folin, 1867)
- Rissoina zeltneri var. paumotuensis Couturier, 1907: synonym of [Zebinella paumotuensis (Couturier, 1907)

Nomina dubia

- Rissoina balteata Pease, 1869
- Rissoina erythraea Philippi, 1851
- Rissoina grandis Philippi, 1847
