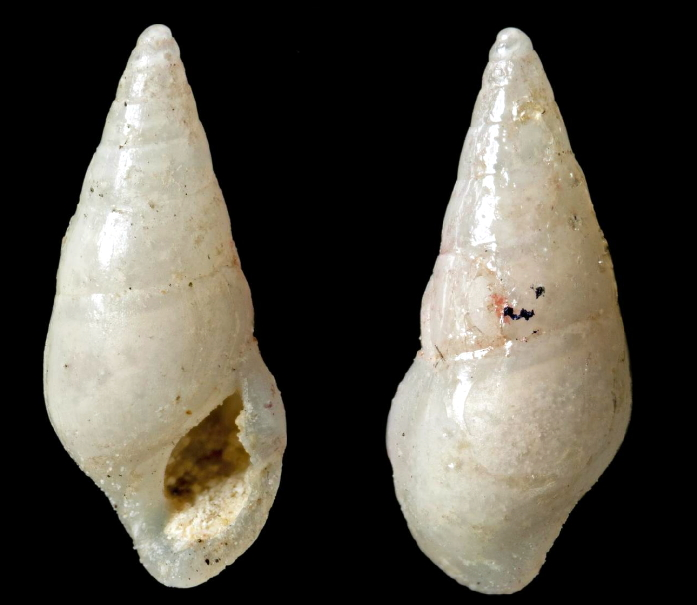
- Shell of Melanella chydaea (syntype at Natural History Museum, London)

Scientific classification
- Kingdom: Animalia
- Phylum: Mollusca
- Class: Gastropoda
- Subclass: Caenogastropoda
- Order: Littorinimorpha
- Family: Eulimidae
- Genus: Melanella
- Species: M. chydaea

Binomial name
- Melanella chydaea Watson, 1883

Synonyms
- Eulima chydaea R. B. Watson, 1883 superseded combination

= Melanella chydaea =

Species of gastropod

Melanella chydaea is a species of sea snail, a marine gastropod mollusk in the family Eulimidae. The species is one of many species known to exist within the genus, Melanella

== Description ==
The maximum recorded shell length is 3.8 mm.

(Original description) The smallish shell is translucent and strong, and rather stumpy in form. It has a short, broadish, rounded base, a symmetrical spire, a small, bluntish, rounded tip, subconvex whorls, an impressed suture, an oblique, pear-shaped aperture, and a thickened lip. Its sculpture is very subtle: the whole surface is scored with faint, regular, microscopic longitudinal streaks.

The shell is translucent white and not very brilliant on the surface.

At the apex the first two or three whorls are a little depressed, the tip is flatly rounded, and the extreme tip hardly rises into view. The spire is conical and straight, with nearly symmetrical profiles. There are 7½ whorls, of regular increase, of which the body whorl alone is a little large; they are slightly convex, while the base is contracted, tumid, and slightly concave. The suture is distinct, being linearly impressed, and the aperture is short and pear-shaped. The outer lip is thickened by an external varix, yet it bears a fine, though blunt, edge, which retreats above and is very patulous in front; in the middle of the solitary specimen it is broken. The inner lip is thickened and concave, with a short, narrowed columella that is crossed in front by a Rissoina-like furrow.

== Distribution ==
This marine species occurs off Culebra Island, Puerto Rico.

== Habitat ==
Minimum recorded depth is 713 m. Maximum recorded depth is 713 m.
