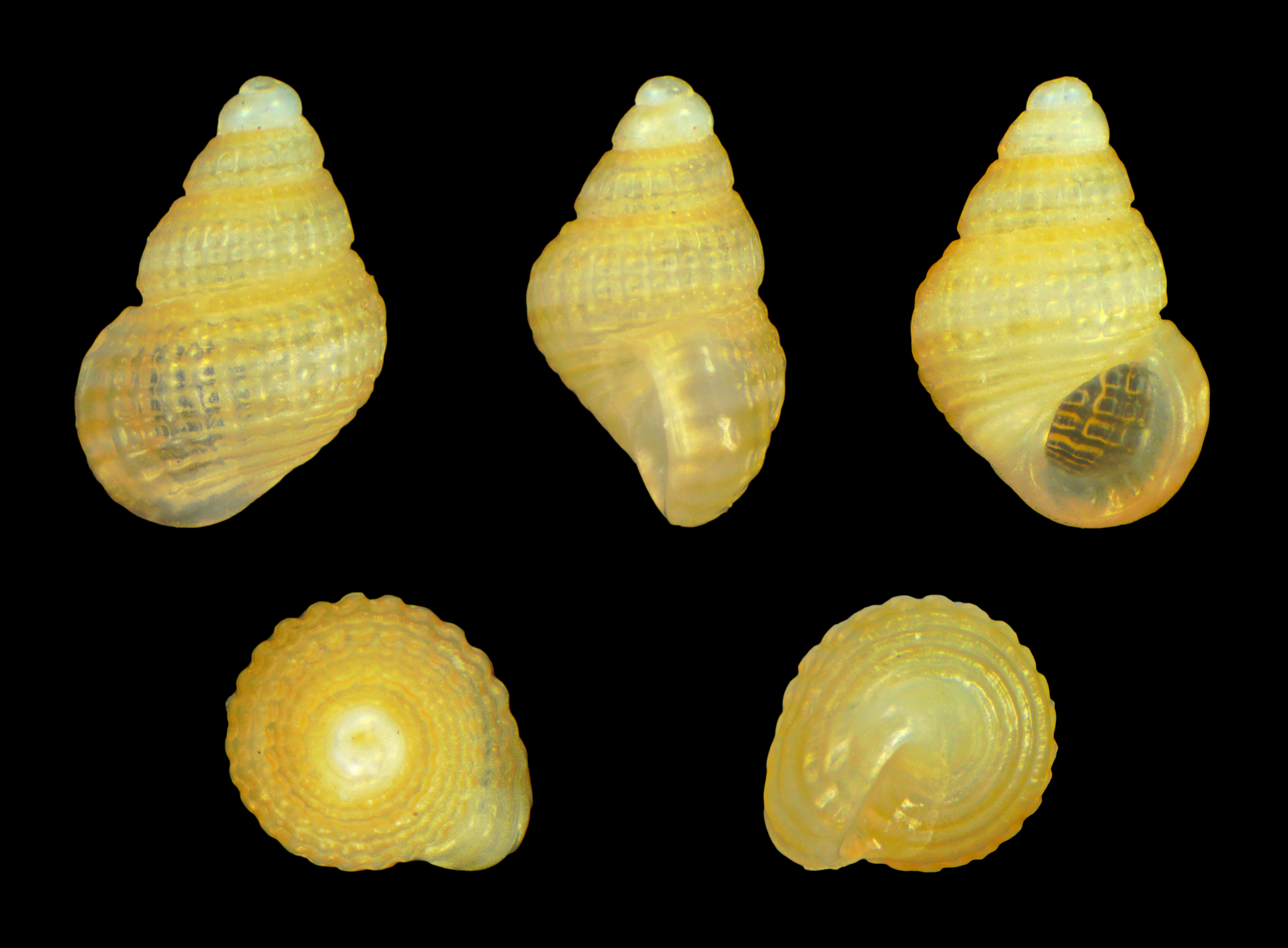

Scientific classification
- Kingdom: Animalia
- Phylum: Mollusca
- Class: Gastropoda
- Subclass: Caenogastropoda
- Order: Littorinimorpha
- Family: Rissoidae
- Genus: Alvania
- Species: A. multiquadrata

Binomial name
- Alvania multiquadrata van der Linden & Wagner, 1989

= Alvania multiquadrata =

Species of gastropod

Alvania multiquadrata is a species of minute sea snail, a marine gastropod mollusk or micromollusk in the family Rissoidae. As a member of the genus Alvania, it is characterized by a robust, often ovate-conical shell featuring intricate sculptural patterns. The specific epithet multiquadrata refers to the characteristic "quadrate" or square-like lattice pattern created by the intersection of strong axial ribs and spiral cords on the shell's surface. This species is typically found in benthic marine habitats, often associated with rocky substrates or algae in the sublittoral zone. Like other rissoids, A. multiquadrata plays a role in the marine ecosystem as a micro-grazer, feeding on detritus and epiphytic algae. Its distribution is primarily documented in the Mediterranean Sea and parts of the Eastern Atlantic, where it contributes to the high biodiversity of micromollusk assemblages.

== Description ==
The length of the shell varies between 1.47 mm and 2 mm.

== Distribution ==
This species occurs in the Atlantic Ocean off the Canary Islands.
