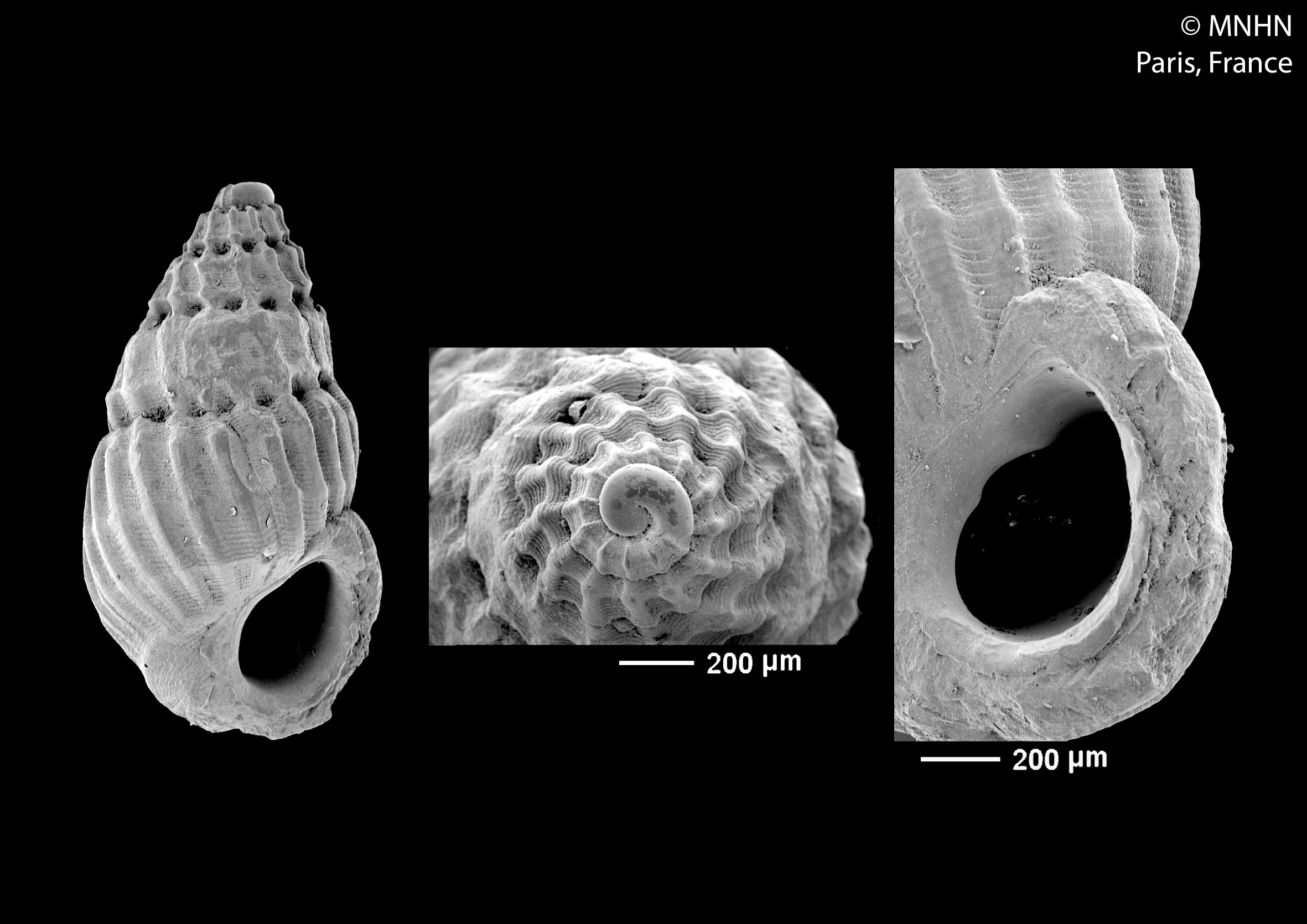
- Shell of Costabieta perforata (holotype at MNHN, Paris)

Scientific classification
- Kingdom: Animalia
- Phylum: Mollusca
- Class: Gastropoda
- Subcohort: Panpulmonata
- Superfamily: Pyramidelloidea
- Family: Pyramidellidae
- Genus: Costabieta; Laseron, 1956

Type species
- Costabieta paucina Laseron, 1956

Synonyms
- Pyramidelloides (Costabieta)

= Costabieta =

Genus of gastropods

Costabieta is a minor genus of sea snails, marine gastropod mollusks in the family Pyramidellidae, the pyrams and their allies.

== Species ==
Species within this genus include:

- Costabieta epentroma (synonym: Rissoina epentroma Melvill, 1896)
- Costabieta horrida (Garrett, 1873) (synonyms: Rissoina horrida Garrett, 1873; Rissiona baxteriana Nevill, 1881; Costabieta paucina Laseron, 1956)
- Costabieta perforata Peñas & Rolán, 2017
- Costabieta portentosa Peñas & Rolán, 2017

Species brought into synonymy

- Costabieta fulgens (Turton, 1932): synonym of Alvania fulgens Turton, 1932
- Costabieta madreporica (Issel, 1869): synonym of Cingula madreporica Issel, 1869
- Costabieta paupera Thiele, 1925: synonym of Rissoa paupera Thiele, 1925
- Costabieta psammitica (Issel, 1869): synonym of Cingula psammatica Issel, 1869
- Costabieta paucina Laseron, 1956: synonym of Costabieta horrida (Garrett, 1873)
- Costabieta sumatrana (Thiele, 1925): synonym of Rissoa sumatrana Thiele, 1925
- Costabieta tosaensis T. Habe, 1961: synonym of Pyramidelloides tosaensis Habe, 1961
- Costabieta waabitica (Issel, 1869): synonym of Cingula waabitica Issel, 1869
