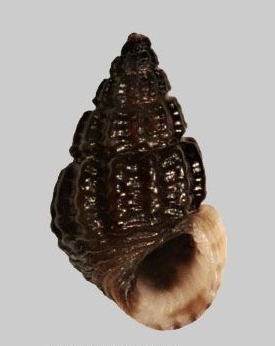
- Shell of Alvania schwartziana (specimen at the Natural History Museum, Rotterdam)

Scientific classification
- Kingdom: Animalia
- Phylum: Mollusca
- Class: Gastropoda
- Subclass: Caenogastropoda
- Order: Littorinimorpha
- Family: Rissoidae
- Genus: Alvania
- Species: A. schwartziana

Binomial name
- Alvania schwartziana Brusina, 1866

= Alvania schwartziana =

Species of gastropod

Alvania schwartziana is a species of small sea snail, a marine gastropod mollusk or micromollusk in the family Rissoidae.

The specific name schwartziana is in honor of Gustav Franziskus Maria Schwartz von Mohrenstern.

== Description ==
The length of the shell attains 3.8 mm.

== Distribution ==
This species occurs in the Adriatic Sea off Croatia; also off Greece.
