= Rissoina redferni =

Scientific classification
- Kingdom: Animalia
- Phylum: Mollusca
- Class: Gastropoda
- Subclass: Caenogastropoda
- Order: Littorinimorpha
- Family: Rissoinidae
- Genus: Rissoina
- Species: R. redferni

Binomial name
- Rissoina redferni Espinosa & Ortea, 2002

Species of gastropod

Rissoina redferni is a species of minute sea snail, a marine gastropod mollusk or micromollusk in the family Rissoinidae.

== Distribution ==
This species occurs in the Caribbean Sea and in the Atlantic Ocean off the Bahamas.

== Description ==
The maximum recorded shell length is 8.5 mm.

== Habitat ==
Minimum recorded depth is 0 m. Maximum recorded depth is 30 m.
