= Rissoina pusilla =

Scientific classification
- Kingdom: Animalia
- Phylum: Mollusca
- Class: Gastropoda
- Subclass: Caenogastropoda
- Order: Littorinimorpha
- Family: Rissoinidae
- Genus: Rissoina
- Species: †R. pusilla

Binomial name
- †Rissoina pusilla (Brocchi, 1814)

Species of gastropod

Rissoina pusilla is a species of small sea snail, a marine gastropod mollusc or micromollusc in the family Rissoinidae.

== Description ==
Only in fossil state.

== Distribution ==
This species occurs in the Indian Ocean off Madagascar.
