= Rissoina sismondiana =

Scientific classification
- Kingdom: Animalia
- Phylum: Mollusca
- Class: Gastropoda
- Subclass: Caenogastropoda
- Order: Littorinimorpha
- Family: Rissoinidae
- Genus: Rissoina
- Species: R. sismondiana

Binomial name
- Rissoina sismondiana Issel, 1869

Species of gastropod

Rissoina sismondiana is a species of minute sea snail, a marine gastropod mollusc or micromollusc in the family Rissoinidae.

== Distribution ==
This species occurs in the Red Sea.
