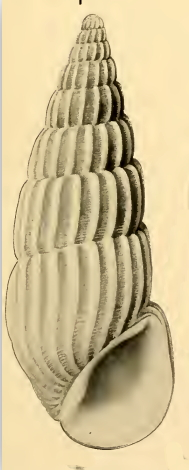
- Shell of Rissoina io (holotype)

Scientific classification
- Kingdom: Animalia
- Phylum: Mollusca
- Class: Gastropoda
- Subclass: Caenogastropoda
- Order: Littorinimorpha
- Family: Rissoinidae
- Genus: Rissoina
- Species: R. io

Binomial name
- Rissoina io Bartsch, 1915

= Rissoina io =

Species of gastropod

Rissoina io is a species of small sea snail, a marine gastropod mollusc in the family Rissoinidae.

== Description ==
The length of the shell attains 9 mm, its diameter 3.5 mm.

(Original description) The shell is large, elongate-conic, and yellowish-white in color. The nuclear whorls have been decollated (broken off), while the postnuclear whorls are slightly rounded and almost flattened in the middle between the sutures. They are weakly shouldered at the summit and are marked by strong, rounded, slightly sinuous, and decidedly protractive axial ribs. These ribs are about one-half as broad as the spaces that separate them.

As the shell grows, the number of ribs increases: 12 ribs occur upon the first turn, 14 upon the second, 16 upon both the third and fifth, 18 upon the sixth, and 20 upon the seventh and penultimate turns. These ribs extend prominently all the way to the summit, which renders the suture itself sinuous.

Between the sutures, the intercostal spaces (the areas between the ribs) are marked by numerous, exceedingly fine, and closely spaced spiral striations. On the later turns, a few of the coarser basal threads begin to appear immediately above the suture.

The base of the shell is moderately long and is marked by continuations of the axial ribs. These ribs extend prominently to the umbilical chink, where they become somewhat fused together to form a basal fasciole. The spiral structure of the base consists of about 15 threads that pass evenly over both the intercostal spaces and the axial ribs. The spaces separating these threads are almost equal to the width of the threads themselves.

The aperture is small, oblique, and ear-shaped (auricular), featuring slight channels at both its anterior and posterior ends. The outer lip is thin at the very edge, but it is heavily reinforced immediately behind the edge by a strong, thickened ridge known as a varix. The inner lip is thick and appressed firmly against the base, becoming free only at its extreme anterior margin. It connects smoothly with the outer lip at the posterior margin, which renders the peritreme entirely complete.

== Distribution ==
This species has been observed off the Galapagos Islands.
