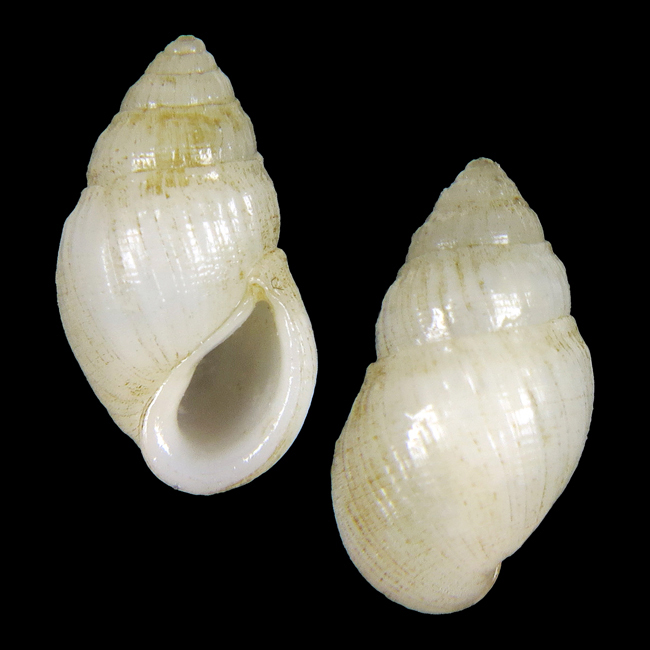

Scientific classification
- Kingdom: Animalia
- Phylum: Mollusca
- Class: Gastropoda
- Subclass: Caenogastropoda
- Order: Littorinimorpha
- Family: Rissoinidae
- Genus: Rissoina
- Species: R. liletae

Binomial name
- Rissoina liletae Poppe, Tagaro & Stahlschmidt, 2015

= Rissoina liletae =

Species of gastropod

Rissoina liletae is a species of sea snail, a marine gastropod mollusk in the family Rissoinidae.

== Description ==
The length of the shell attains 6.9 mm.

== Distribution ==
This marine species occurs off the Philippines.

== Original description ==
- Poppe G.T., Tagaro S.P. & Stahlschmidt P. (2015). New shelled molluscan species from the central Philippines I. Visaya. 4(3): 15–59. page(s): 25–26; plate 8, figs. 4a-b, 5a-b.
