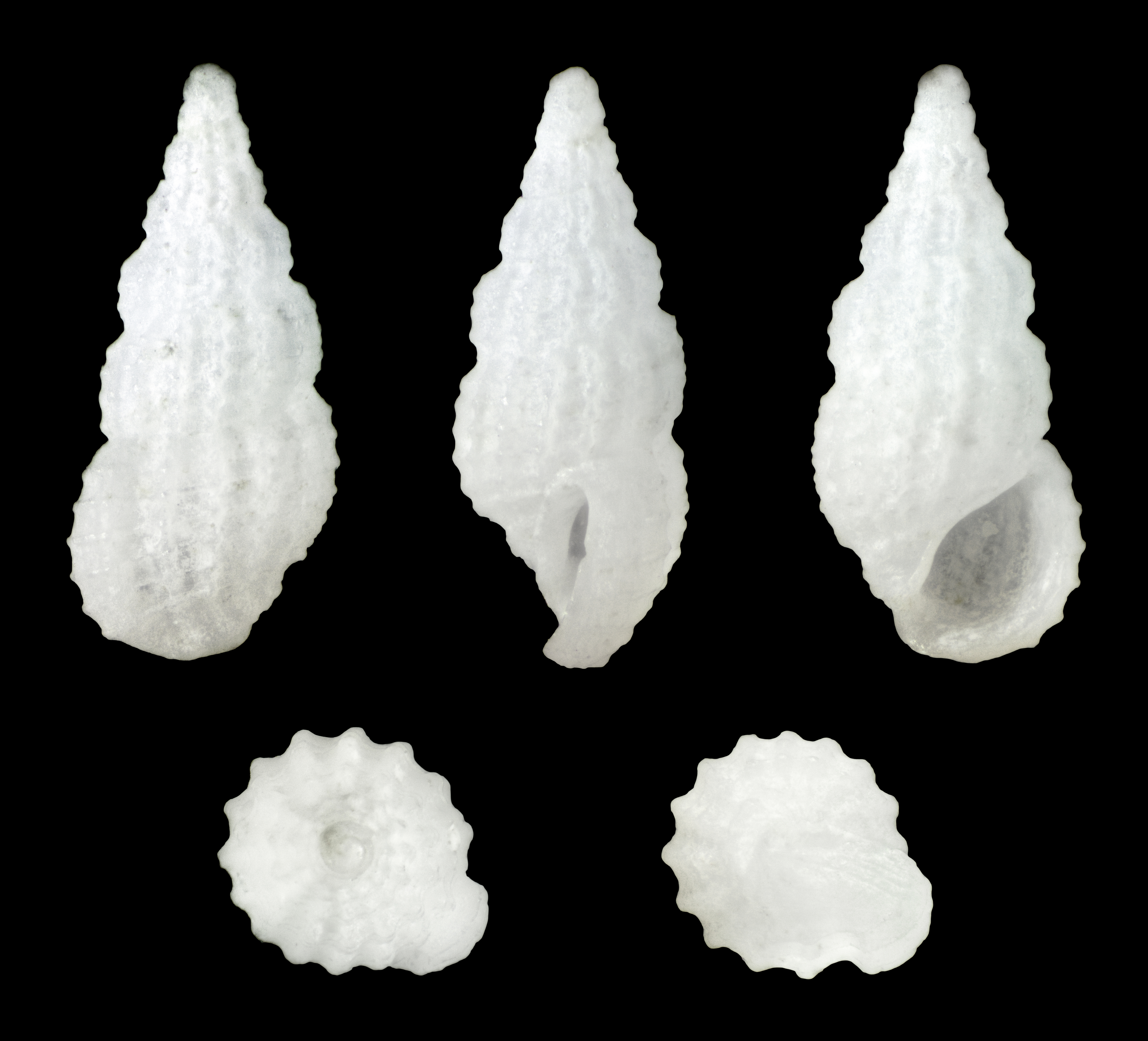

Scientific classification
- Kingdom: Animalia
- Phylum: Mollusca
- Class: Gastropoda
- Subclass: Caenogastropoda
- Order: Littorinimorpha
- Family: Rissoinidae
- Genus: Rissoina
- Species: R. deshayesi

Binomial name
- Rissoina deshayesi Schwartz, 1860

Synonyms
- Rissoina (Phosinella) deshayesi Schwartz, 1860

= Rissoina deshayesi =

Species of gastropod

Rissoina deshayesi is a species of small sea snail, a marine gastropod mollusk or micromollusk in the family Rissoinidae.

== Description ==
The height of the shell attains 5.5 mm.

== Distribution ==
This species occurs in the Indian Ocean off Réunion and the Aldabra Atol.
