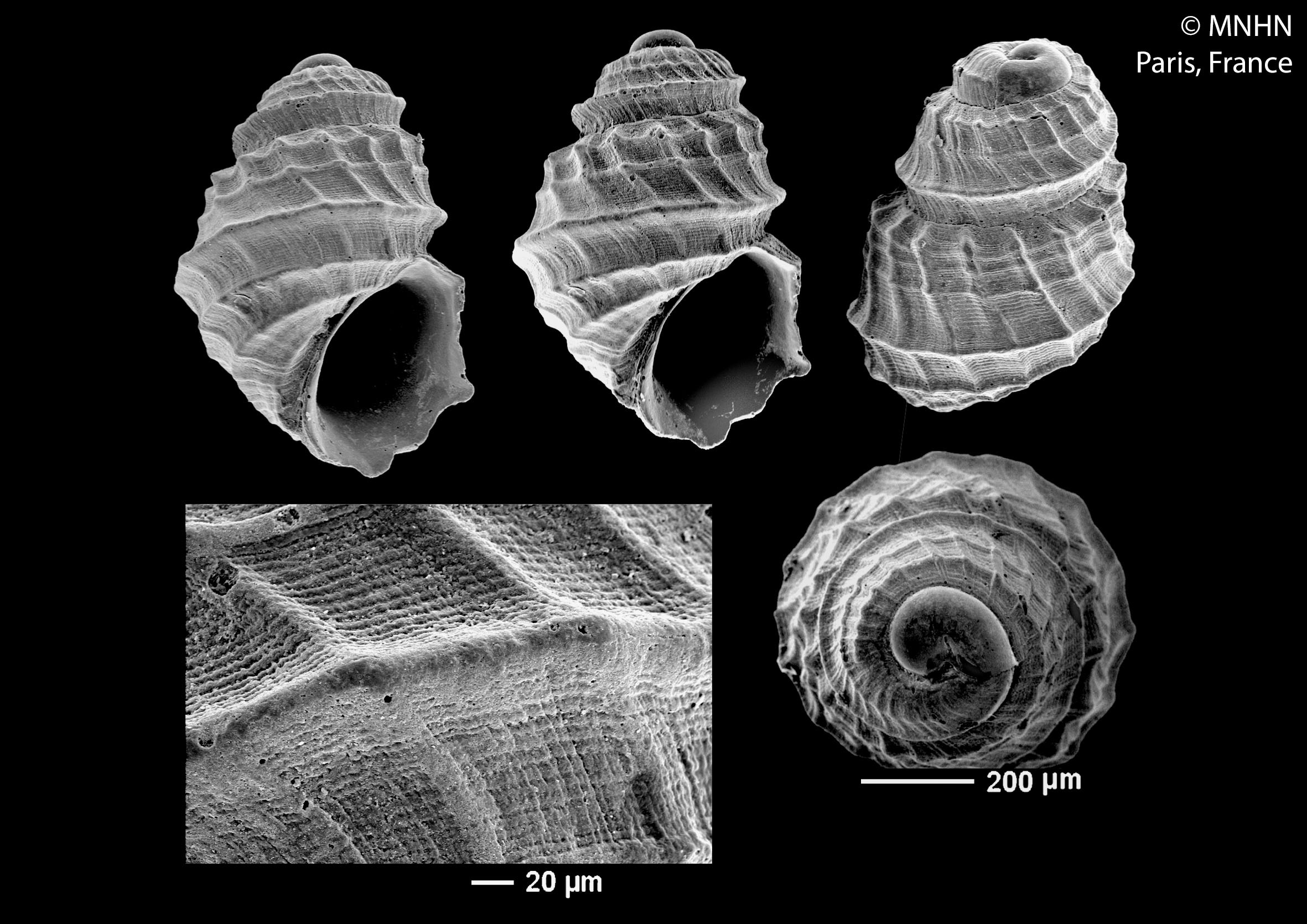
- Shell of Herewardia gabrielae (holotype at MNHN, Paris)

Scientific classification
- Kingdom: Animalia
- Phylum: Mollusca
- Class: Gastropoda
- Family: Pyramidellidae
- Genus: Herewardia; Iredale, 1935

Type species
- Rissoina kesteveni Hedley, 1907

= Herewardia =

Genus of gastropods

Herewardia is a genus of sea snails, marine gastropod mollusks in the family Pyramidellidae, the pyrams and their allies.

== Species ==
Species within the genus Herewardia include:

- Herewardia gabrielae Peñas & Rolán, 2017
- Herewardia kesteveni (Hedley, 1907)
- Herewardia microstriae Peñas & Rolán, 2017
- Herewardia osmagnum Peñas & Rolán, 2017
