= Rissoina costata =

Scientific classification
- Kingdom: Animalia
- Phylum: Mollusca
- Class: Gastropoda
- Subclass: Caenogastropoda
- Order: Littorinimorpha
- Family: Rissoinidae
- Genus: Rissoina
- Species: R. costata

Binomial name
- Rissoina costata A. Adams, 1851

Synonyms
- Rissoina turricula Pease, 1861

Species of gastropod

Rissoina costata is a species of small sea snail, a marine gastropod mollusk or micromollusk in the family Rissoinidae.

== Distribution ==
This species occurs in the Indian Ocean off Aldabra.
