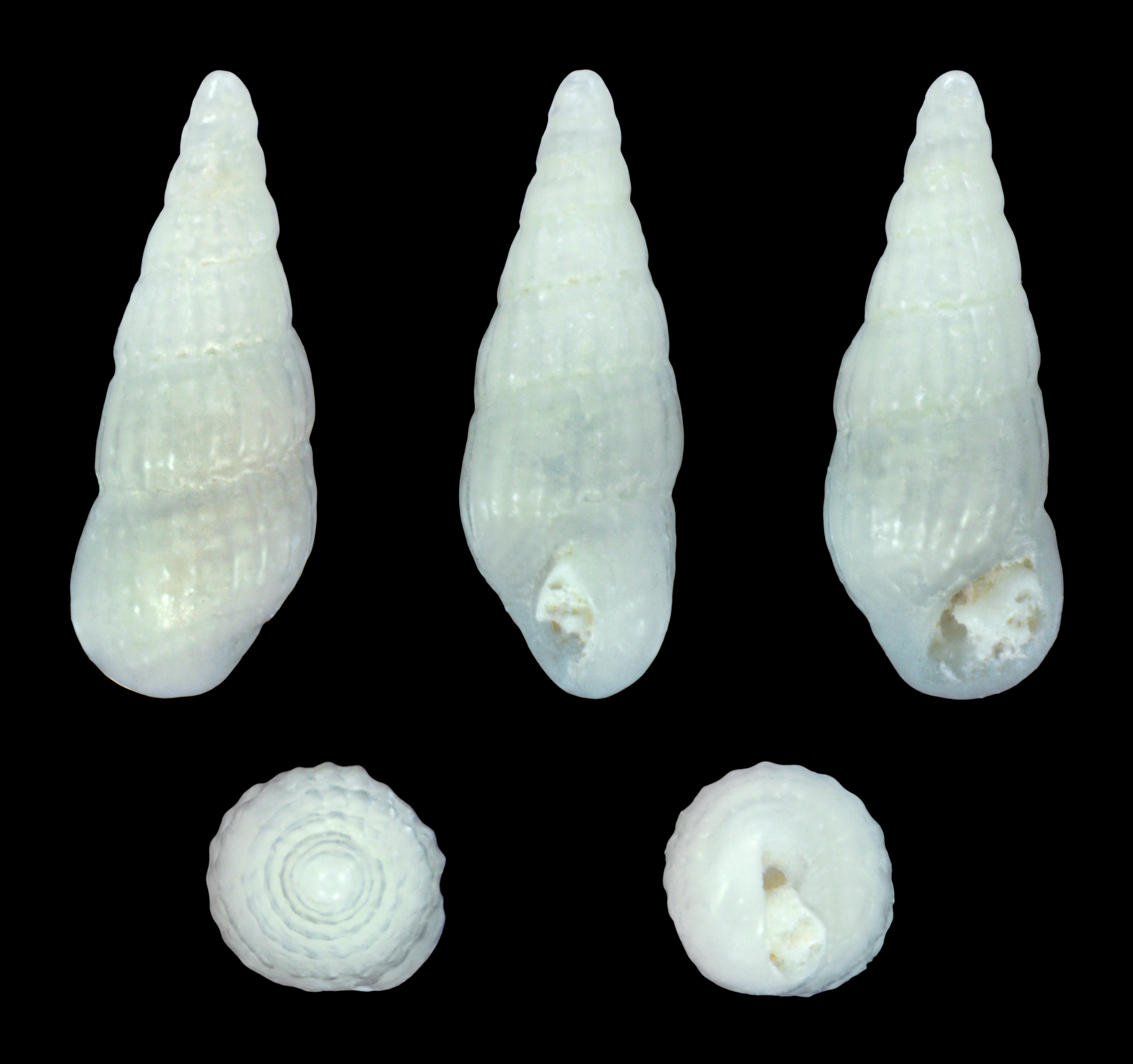

Scientific classification
- Kingdom: Animalia
- Phylum: Mollusca
- Class: Gastropoda
- Subclass: Caenogastropoda
- Order: Littorinimorpha
- Family: Rissoinidae
- Genus: Rissoina
- Species: R. erythraea

Binomial name
- Rissoina erythraea Philippi, 1851

= Rissoina erythraea =

Species of gastropod

Rissoina erythraea is a species of small sea snail, a marine gastropod mollusc or micromollusc in the family Rissoinidae.

This is a nomen dubium.

== Distribution ==
This species occurs in the Red Sea and in the Indian Ocean off Madagascar.
