= Rissoina mercurialis =

- Shell of Rissoina mercurialis (specimen at the Natural History Museum, London)

Scientific classification
- Kingdom: Animalia
- Phylum: Mollusca
- Class: Gastropoda
- Subclass: Caenogastropoda
- Order: Littorinimorpha
- Family: Rissoinidae
- Genus: Rissoina
- Species: R. mercurialis

Binomial name
- Rissoina mercurialis R. B. Watson, 1886

Synonyms
- Costalynia bilinea Laseron, 1956 junior subjective synonym; Rissoina (Rissolina) mercurialis R. B. Watson, 1886 alternative representation

Species of snail

Rissoina mercurialis is a species of small sea snail, a marine gastropod mollusc in the family Rissoinidae.

== Description ==
The shell, 2–4 mm in size, has a conical shape and is white. The protoconch is three whorls, with sculpture beginning on the third. The sculpture contains strong axial ribs which are slightly oblique and curved. The basal fold is strong and is overridden by the axial ribs. The aperture is oval and oblique. The varix is strong and wide, thick internally and externally covered with ridges.

== Distribution ==
This species has been found in Australia.
