= Pseudorissoina =

Scientific classification
- Kingdom: Animalia
- Phylum: Mollusca
- Class: Gastropoda
- Family: Pyramidellidae
- Genus: Pseudorissoina; Tate & May, 1900

Synonyms
- Liostomia (Pseudorissoina) Tate & May, 1900

Genus of gastropods

Pseudorissoina is a genus of sea snails, marine gastropod mollusks in the family Pyramidellidae, the pyrams and their allies.

== Species ==
Species within the genus Pseudorissoina include:

- Pseudorissoina perexiguus (Tate & May, 1900)
- Pseudorissoina tasmanica (Tenison-Woods, 1877)

The following species were brought into synonymy:

- Pseudorissoina minutissima (Tenison Woods, 1878) accepted as Pseudorissoina perexiguus (Tate & May, 1900)
