= Rissoina plicata =

Scientific classification
- Kingdom: Animalia
- Phylum: Mollusca
- Class: Gastropoda
- Subclass: Caenogastropoda
- Order: Littorinimorpha
- Family: Rissoinidae
- Genus: Rissoina
- Species: R. plicata

Binomial name
- Rissoina plicata A. Adams

Species of gastropod

Rissoina plicata is a species of small sea snail, a marine gastropod mollusk or micromollusk in the family Rissoinidae.

== Description ==
The length of the shell attains 6.3 mm.

== Distribution ==
This species occurs in the Red Sea and in the Indian Ocean off the Chagos Archipelago and Aldabra; in the Pacific Ocean off Japan; in the Easter Mediterranean Sea.
