= Rissoina harryleei =

Scientific classification
- Kingdom: Animalia
- Phylum: Mollusca
- Class: Gastropoda
- Subclass: Caenogastropoda
- Order: Littorinimorpha
- Family: Rissoinidae
- Genus: Rissoina
- Species: R. harryleei

Binomial name
- Rissoina harryleei Rolán & Fernández-Garcés, 2009

Species of gastropod

Rissoina harryleei is a species of small sea snail, a marine gastropod mollusk or micromollusk in the family Rissoinidae.

== Distribution ==
This species occurs in the Atlantic Ocean off the Bermudas.
