= Rissoina angeli =

Scientific classification
- Kingdom: Animalia
- Phylum: Mollusca
- Class: Gastropoda
- Subclass: Caenogastropoda
- Order: Littorinimorpha
- Family: Rissoinidae
- Genus: Rissoina
- Species: R. angeli

Binomial name
- Rissoina angeli Espinosa & Ortea, 2002

Species of gastropod

Rissoina angeli is a species of minute sea snail, a marine gastropod mollusk or micromollusk in the family Rissoinidae.

== Distribution ==
This species occurs in the Gulf of Mexico and the Caribbean Sea off Cuba.

== Description ==
The maximum recorded shell length is 6.3 mm.

== Habitat ==
Minimum recorded depth is 50 m. Maximum recorded depth is 50 m.
