= Ailinzebina =

Scientific classification
- Kingdom: Animalia
- Phylum: Mollusca
- Class: Gastropoda
- Subclass: Caenogastropoda
- Order: Littorinimorpha
- Family: Rissoinidae
- Genus: Ailinzebina; Ladd, 1966

Type species
- Zebina (Ailinzebina) abrardi Ladd, 1966

Synonyms
- Rissoina (Ailinzebina) Ladd, 1966; Zebina (Ailinzebina) Ladd, 1966

Genus of gastropods

Ailinzebina is a small genus of minute sea snails, marine gastropod mollusks or micromollusks, in the family Rissoinidae.

== Species ==
- Ailinzebina abrardi (Ladd, 1966)
- Ailinzebina elegantissima (d'Orbigny, 1842)
- Ailinzebina laticostata Faber, 2013
- Ailinzebina onobiformis (Rolán & Luque, 2000)
- Ailinzebina sleursi Faber, 2013
