= Rissoina scolopax =

Scientific classification
- Kingdom: Animalia
- Phylum: Mollusca
- Class: Gastropoda
- Subclass: Caenogastropoda
- Order: Littorinimorpha
- Family: Rissoinidae
- Genus: Rissoina
- Species: R. scolopax

Binomial name
- Rissoina scolopax Souverbie, 1877

Species of sea snail

Rissoina scolopax is a species of small sea snail, a marine gastropod mollusc in the family Rissoinidae.

== Description ==
The shell reaches 10 mm with textured whorls.

(Original description in French) The shell is fusiform and pyramidal, rough to the touch, and somewhat blunt at the apex. It is latticed by strong longitudinal ribs crossed by slightly smaller transverse ribs, which continue as far as the edge of the outer lip and become nodulose where they intersect the longitudinal ribs. In addition, the base of the shell is encircled by a strong, somewhat nodulose, subterminal spiral cord, separated from the transverse ribs by a fairly broad groove.

The shell consists of nine and a half whorls, divided by a well-impressed suture. The first whorl and half of the second, which are embryonic, are smooth and white. The remaining whorls, up to and including the penultimate, are somewhat flat, while the body whorl is slightly convex and does not equal one fifth of the total length of the shell.

The aperture is semilunar and oblique. The outer lip is sharp though slightly blunt, somewhat prolonged anteriorly, and broadly varicose externally. The inner lip is slightly thickened and lies closely appressed against the columella. The shell is glossy and of a faintly crystalline white colour.

== Biology ==
This species is a detritivore.

== Distribution ==
This species lives in benthic zones in the western Pacific, near Japan, New Caledonia, and the Philippines.
