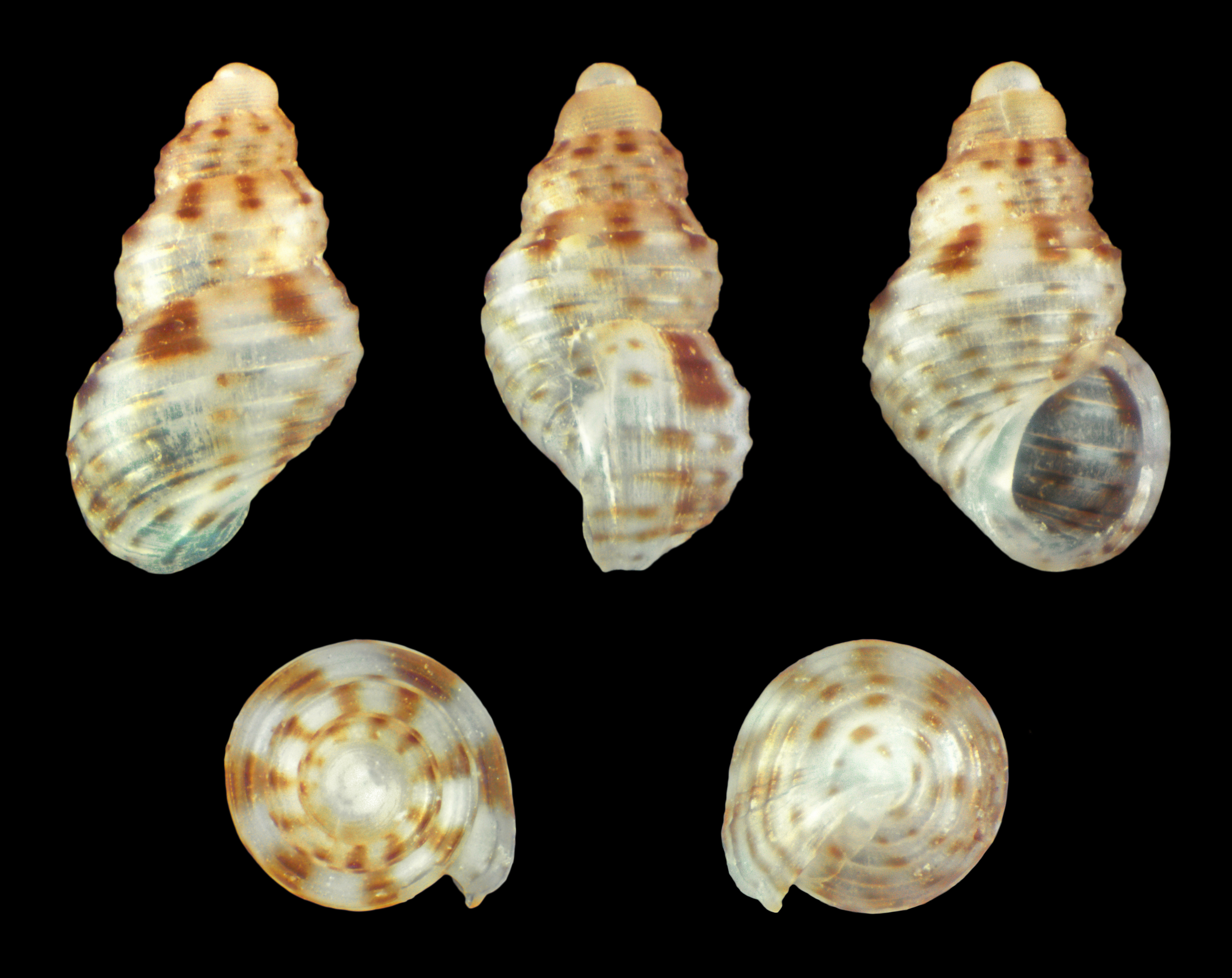

Scientific classification
- Kingdom: Animalia
- Phylum: Mollusca
- Class: Gastropoda
- Subclass: Caenogastropoda
- Order: Littorinimorpha
- Superfamily: Rissooidea
- Family: Rissoidae
- Genus: Alvania
- Species: A. watsoni

Binomial name
- Alvania watsoni (Schwartz in Watson, 1873)

Synonyms
- Rissoa watsoni Schwartz von Mohrenstern, 1873

= Alvania watsoni =

Species of gastropod

Alvania watsoni is a species of small sea snail, a marine gastropod mollusk or micromollusk in the family Rissoidae.

== Description ==
A. watsoni measures approximately 1.7 by 1.0 mm and lacks strong defining characteristics, although some may exhibit enlarged growth lines or a black spot at the tip of the shell's spire.

(Original description) The conic-oblong shell is thin, transparent, rather brilliant and glossy. The whorls rise somewhat in steps.

Sculpture. There are 9-10 spiral threads on the body whorl. These are prominent and rounded. The first are generally smaller than others. The second forms a kind of shoulder, and along with third and fourth is usually somewhat more prominent than the rest. The last winds close round the columella. On the fourth whorl there are four of these threads. On the third and lower part of second whorl there are three. In the second whorl these threads are abruptly cut off, and are replaced in the embryonic shell by about eight non-transparent spiral furrows, parted by fretted ridges. The interstices of the spiral threads are from two to three times the breadth of the threads, the three higher threads being somewhat wider apart than the others. In these interstices the surface is covered with microscopic spiral scratches, which, however, are neither sharp nor deep enough to interfere with the general glossiness of the shell. Very often these interstices are crossed longitudinally at unequal intervals by 20 to 25 faint ribs (sometimes no more than lines), which do not at all show upon the threads, and which die away at the periphery. The labial rib is somewhat remote from the outer lip. It is rather broad, and is very little raised.

The colour of the shell is generally yellowish white, flecked along the spiral threads and also (near the suture) in the interstices with opaque white and brilliant ruddy brown patches, often passing over from this into uniform dull white or rich brown. The extreme apex never has a blackish tip.

The spire is long, ending in a perfectly hemispherical top, of which the embryonic tip generally forms the very apex. The shell contains 4½ whorls of regular increase, not so much rounded as angulated by a sloping shoulder below the suture, most strongly marked on left side of the shell. The suture is very strongly marked, but shallow, somewhat oblique. The aperture is very well rounded, its curve being only a little contracted across the body, very slightly expanded at lower inner corner. The outer lip is sharp and thin, scarcely marked on outside by the spiral threads. The inner lip is very sharp, and so far reflected and projecting as it advances downwards as almost wholly to conceal the columella, leaving a slight umbilical chink behind it. It is thinly continued across the body whorl to meet the upper corner of the outer lip.

== Distribution ==
A. watsoni is found in the waters of the Canary Islands and Madeira.; in the Mediterranean Sea off Algeria
