= Rissoina bertholleti =

Scientific classification
- Kingdom: Animalia
- Phylum: Mollusca
- Class: Gastropoda
- Subclass: Caenogastropoda
- Order: Littorinimorpha
- Family: Rissoinidae
- Genus: Rissoina
- Species: R. bertholleti

Binomial name
- Rissoina bertholleti Issel, 1869

Species of gastropod

Rissoina bertholleti is a species of small sea snail, a marine gastropod mollusk or micromollusk in the family Rissoinidae.

== Description ==
The shell is elongated and thick. It has seven to eight convex whorls. There is a thick cord running over the abapical end of the body whorl. The color is a whitish with a blurry brown suprasutural band, fading out on the body whorl. The height of the shell is between 4 mm and 7 mm.

== Distribution ==
This marine species occurs worldwide: in the Eastern Mediterranean Sea, the Red Sea and the Indian Ocean off Madagascar
