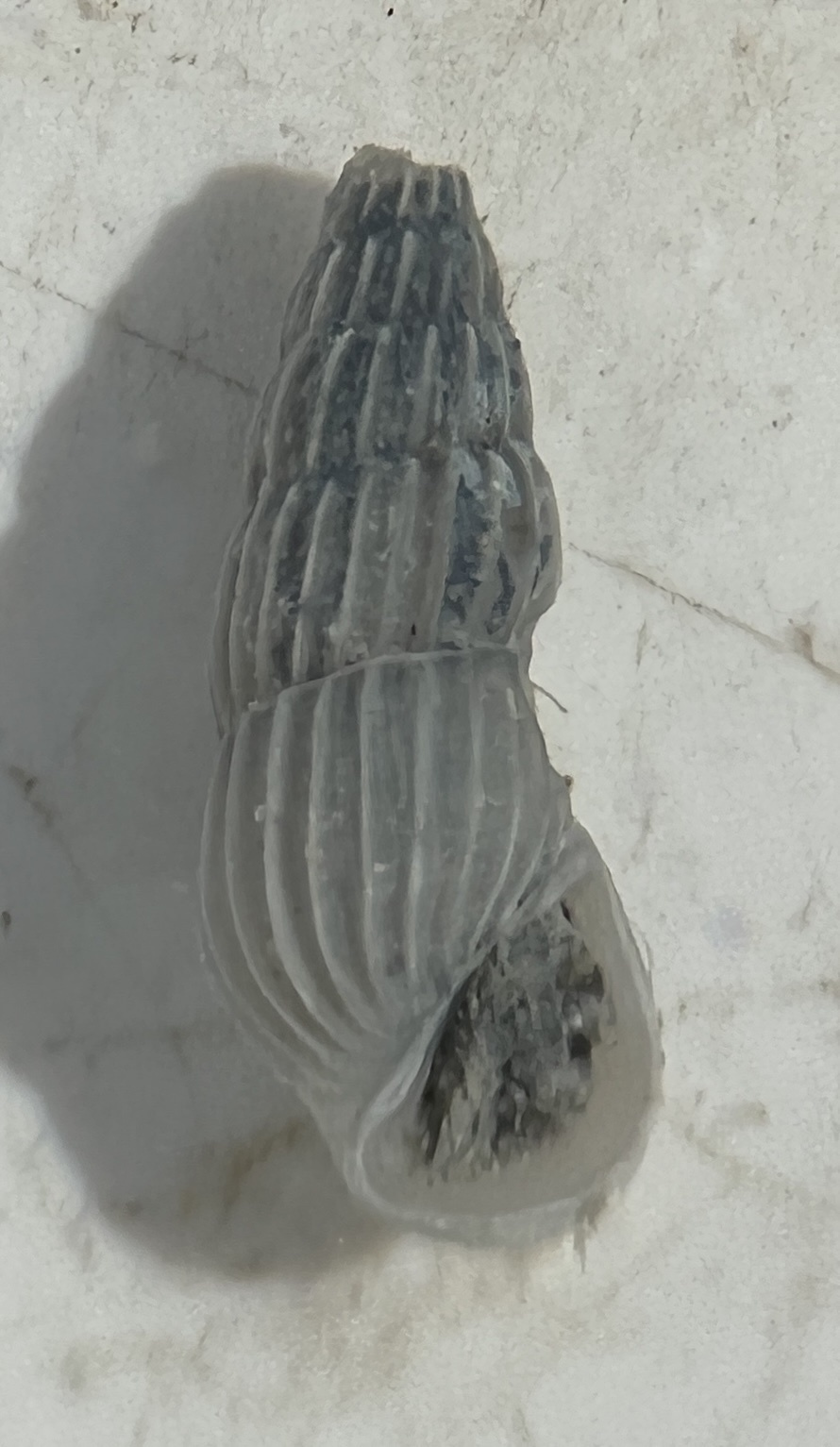

Scientific classification
- Kingdom: Animalia
- Phylum: Mollusca
- Class: Gastropoda
- Subclass: Caenogastropoda
- Order: Littorinimorpha
- Family: Rissoinidae
- Genus: Rissoina
- Species: R. dyscrita

Binomial name
- Rissoina dyscrita Faber, 1990

Synonyms
- Rissoina bryerea auct. non Montagu, 1803; Schwartziella dyscrita (Faber, 1990)

= Rissoina dyscrita =

Species of gastropod

Rissoina dyscrita is a species of minute sea snail, a marine gastropod mollusk or micromollusk in the family Rissoinidae.

== Description ==
The maximum recorded shell length is 6 mm.

== Distribution and habitat ==
This species can be found in the Caribbean Sea, the Gulf of Mexico and the Lesser Antilles. They can also be found in Eastern Florida to Lesser Antilles, and Bermuda.

It is typically found in benthic, grazer, hard substrate, or soft substrate (muds, sands, clays) habitats. Minimum recorded depth is 0 m. Maximum recorded depth is 4.5 m.
