= Rissoina krebsii =

Scientific classification
- Kingdom: Animalia
- Phylum: Mollusca
- Class: Gastropoda
- Subclass: Caenogastropoda
- Order: Littorinimorpha
- Family: Rissoinidae
- Genus: Rissoina
- Species: R. krebsii

Binomial name
- Rissoina krebsii (Mörch, 1876)

Synonyms
- Rissoina multicostata auct. non C. B. Adams, 1850; Rissoa krebsii Mörch, 1876 (original description); Rissoina parkeri Olsson & Harbison, 1953

Species of gastropod

Rissoina krebsii is a species of small sea snail, a marine gastropod mollusk or micromollusk in the family Rissoinidae.

== Distribution ==
This species occurs in the Gulf of Mexico off Cuba.

== Description ==
The maximum recorded shell length is 4.5 mm.

== Habitat ==
Minimum recorded depth is 0 m. Maximum recorded depth is 45 m.
