= Rissoina stricta =

Scientific classification
- Kingdom: Animalia
- Phylum: Mollusca
- Class: Gastropoda
- Subclass: Caenogastropoda
- Order: Littorinimorpha
- Family: Rissoinidae
- Genus: Rissoina
- Species: R. stricta

Binomial name
- Rissoina stricta (Menke, 1851)

Species of sea snail

Rissoina stricta is a species of minute sea snail, a marine gastropod mollusc in the family Rissoinidae.

== Description ==
The shell ranges from 5.6 to 9 mm in length.

== Distribution ==
This species lives in littoral zones off the Galapagos Islands.
