= Rissoina tongunensis =

Scientific classification
- Kingdom: Animalia
- Phylum: Mollusca
- Class: Gastropoda
- Subclass: Caenogastropoda
- Order: Littorinimorpha
- Family: Rissoinidae
- Genus: Rissoina
- Species: R. tongunensis

Binomial name
- Rissoina tongunensis Wen-Der Chen, 2008

Species of gastropod

Rissoina tongunensis is a species of minute sea snail, a marine gastropod mollusk or micromollusk in the family Rissoinidae.
