= Rissoina spirata =

Scientific classification
- Kingdom: Animalia
- Phylum: Mollusca
- Class: Gastropoda
- Subclass: Caenogastropoda
- Order: Littorinimorpha
- Family: Rissoinidae
- Genus: Rissoina
- Species: R. spirata

Binomial name
- Rissoina spirata Sowerby G.B. I, 1820

Synonyms
- Zebina spirata (Sowerby I, 1825)

Species of gastropod

Rissoina spirata, the spiral risso, is a species of small sea snail, a marine gastropod mollusc or micromollusc in the family Rissoinidae.

== Description ==
The size of the shell varies between 7 mm and 15 mm.

== Distribution ==
This species occurs in the Red Sea, in the Indian Ocean off Madagascar and the Aldabra Atoll; in the Central Pacific; in the Mediterranean Sea.
