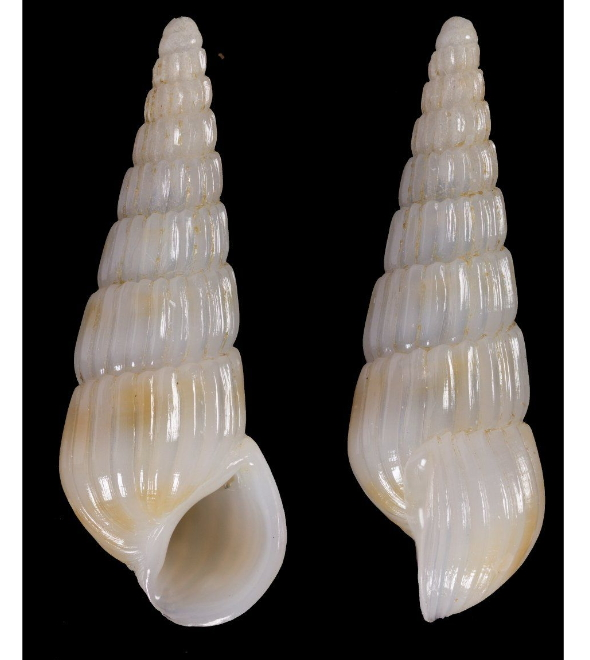
- Shell of Rissoina boucheti (holotype at MNHN, Paris)

Scientific classification
- Kingdom: Animalia
- Phylum: Mollusca
- Class: Gastropoda
- Subclass: Caenogastropoda
- Order: Littorinimorpha
- Family: Rissoinidae
- Genus: Rissoina
- Species: R. boucheti

Binomial name
- Rissoina boucheti Sleurs, 1991

= Rissoina boucheti =

Species of sea snail

Rissoina boucheti is a species of small sea snail, a marine gastropod mollusc in the family Rissoinidae named for Philippe Bouchet, a French malacologist.

== Description ==
The shell is 9.9 millimetres (0.39 in) and is elongate conical, with a yellow-white color. The protoconch has two whorls and the teleoconch has around seven or eight. The whorls of the teleoconch are flat and weakly angulate. The axial ribs are opisthocline, ranging from sharp to weak. The spiral structure varies heavily from small to prominent.

The aperture is moderately large, with a moderately concave columellar side and a narrow anterior channel. The outer lip has prominent interior swelling near the anterior column.

The operculum is thick. The radula has a ventral margin with a developed extension with the lateral margins intersecting at an angle of 30 degrees. The mouth opens between two thick lips into a large buccal tube. The salivary glands are just simple tubes, and the esophagus is uniform in structure, having ten internal folds. The stomach takes up one whorl.

== Distribution ==
This species occurs off New Caledonia.
