= Rissoina parkeri =

Scientific classification
- Kingdom: Animalia
- Phylum: Mollusca
- Class: Gastropoda
- Subclass: Caenogastropoda
- Order: Littorinimorpha
- Family: Rissoinidae
- Genus: Rissoina
- Species: R. parkeri

Binomial name
- Rissoina parkeri Olsson & Harbison, 1953

Species of gastropod

Rissoina parkeri is a species of small sea snail, a marine gastropod mollusc in the family Rissoinidae.

== Description ==
The shell has been described to be around either 4 mm or 6.0-6.2 mm in size.

== Distribution ==
This species has been found in Florida.
