= Gustav Schwartz =

Austrian paleontologist and malacologist

Gustav Schwartz (his last name also spelled Schwarz), full name Gustav Franziskus Maria Schwarz von Mohrenstern (May 5, 1809 – June 15, 1890) was an Austrian paleontologist and malacologist. He was born in Himberg, the son of Johann Jakov Schwartz von Mohrenstern. He died by suicide in Vienna.

He studied the natural sciences from 1823 to 1828 at polytechnic school, an Austrian career preparatory high school system in the Austrian education system. In later life, he specialized in the study of the Rissoidae, a large and challenging family of very small marine gastropod mollusks. His unfinished thesis was on the rissoid genus Alvania.

In 1867, Schwartz was a correspondent of the Academy of Natural Sciences of Philadelphia.

== Taxa described by Schwartz ==
Taxa described by Schwartz include:

- Alvania watsoni (1873)
- Rissoina philippiana (1860)
- Rissoina antoni (1860)
- Rissoina basteroti (1860)
- Rissoina bicollaris (1860)
- Rissoina canaliculata (1860)
- Rissoina coronata (1860)
- Rissoina deshayesi (1860)
- Rissoina fenestrata (1860)
- Rissoina hanleyi (1860)
- Rissoina labrosa (1860)
- Rissoina myosoroides (1864)
- Rissoina obeliscus (1860)
- Rissoina media (1860)
- Phosinella media (1860)

== Taxa named in honor of Schwartz ==
Taxa named in honor of Schwartz include:

- Schwartziella G. Nevill, 1881
- Alvania schwartziana Brusina, 1866

== Publications ==
- Über die Familie der Rissoiden und Insbesondere die Gattung Rissoina, 1860. Austrian Academy of Sciences, Vienna
- Über die Familie der Rissoiden. II. Rissoa., 1864. Austrian Academy of Sciences, Vienna
- Rissoidae, A Mollus Family, Denkschriften der Kaiserlichen Volume 19, 1861 Austrian Academy of Sciences, Vienna
