= Rissoina meteoris =

Scientific classification
- Kingdom: Animalia
- Phylum: Mollusca
- Class: Gastropoda
- Subclass: Caenogastropoda
- Order: Littorinimorpha
- Family: Rissoinidae
- Genus: Rissoina
- Species: R. meteoris

Binomial name
- Rissoina meteoris Gofas, 2007

Species of gastropod

Rissoina meteoris is a species of minute sea snail, a marine gastropod mollusk or micromollusk in the family Rissoinidae.

== Description ==
The height of the very slender shell varies between 5.5 mm to 9.0 mm The protoconch consists of 1.25 whorl, and the teleoconch of ca. 10 very flat whorls. The protoconchis smooth, the teleoconch apparently smooth and glossy but with tiny punctures visible only under very high magnification, densely set in spiral bands. The aperture is piriform, channelled at the insertion of outer lip on the previous whorl. The outer lip is definitely opisthocline, thickened but not demarcated from the body whorl, with rounded edge, inside slightly swollen near parietal insertion

== Distribution ==
This species is found on the Great Meteor seamount in the northeast Atlantic at a depth of 470 m.
