= Pseudorissoina tasmanica =

Scientific classification
- Kingdom: Animalia
- Phylum: Mollusca
- Class: Gastropoda
- Family: Pyramidellidae
- Genus: Pseudorissoina
- Species: P. tasmanica

Binomial name
- Pseudorissoina tasmanica (Tenison-Woods, 1877)

Synonyms
- Liostomia (Pseudorissoina) tasmanica (Tenison Woods, 1877); Stylifer tasmanica Tenison-Woods, 1877

Species of gastropod

Pseudorissoina tasmanica is a species of sea snail, a marine gastropod mollusk in the family Pyramidellidae, the pyrams and their allies.

== Distribution ==
This marine species occurs in the Bass Strait, off Tasmania and off Victoria, South Australia.
