= Rissoina punctostriata =

Scientific classification
- Kingdom: Animalia
- Phylum: Mollusca
- Class: Gastropoda
- Subclass: Caenogastropoda
- Order: Littorinimorpha
- Family: Rissoinidae
- Genus: Rissoina
- Species: R. punctostriata

Binomial name
- Rissoina punctostriata (Talavera, 1975)

Synonyms
- Rissoina decussata auct. non Montagu, G., 1803; Zebina punctostriata Talavera, 1975 (original combination)

Species of gastropod

Rissoina punctostriata is a species of small sea snail, a marine gastropod mollusk or micromollusk in the family Rissoinidae.

== Description ==
The shell is small, white, elongate-conical, and relatively thin, measuring approximately 5-10mm in length and 2.5-3.5 mm in width. The protoconch consists of three spiral smooth whorls, with the final whorl having a diameter of about 400 μm, indicating a plankotrophic type larval development. A spiral cord appears in the middle of the last quarter of the final whorl.

The teleoconch consists of 6-7 whorls. The first 3-4 spire whorls are distinctively angulated, while subsequent whorls become gradually convex. The suture is shallow with a subsutural depression that gradually becomes more pronounced on later whorls, creating a slightly undulating profile.

== Distribution ==
This species occurs in the Atlantic Ocean off Mauritania, Senegal, Angola, the Cape Verdes, São Tomé and Príncipe.
