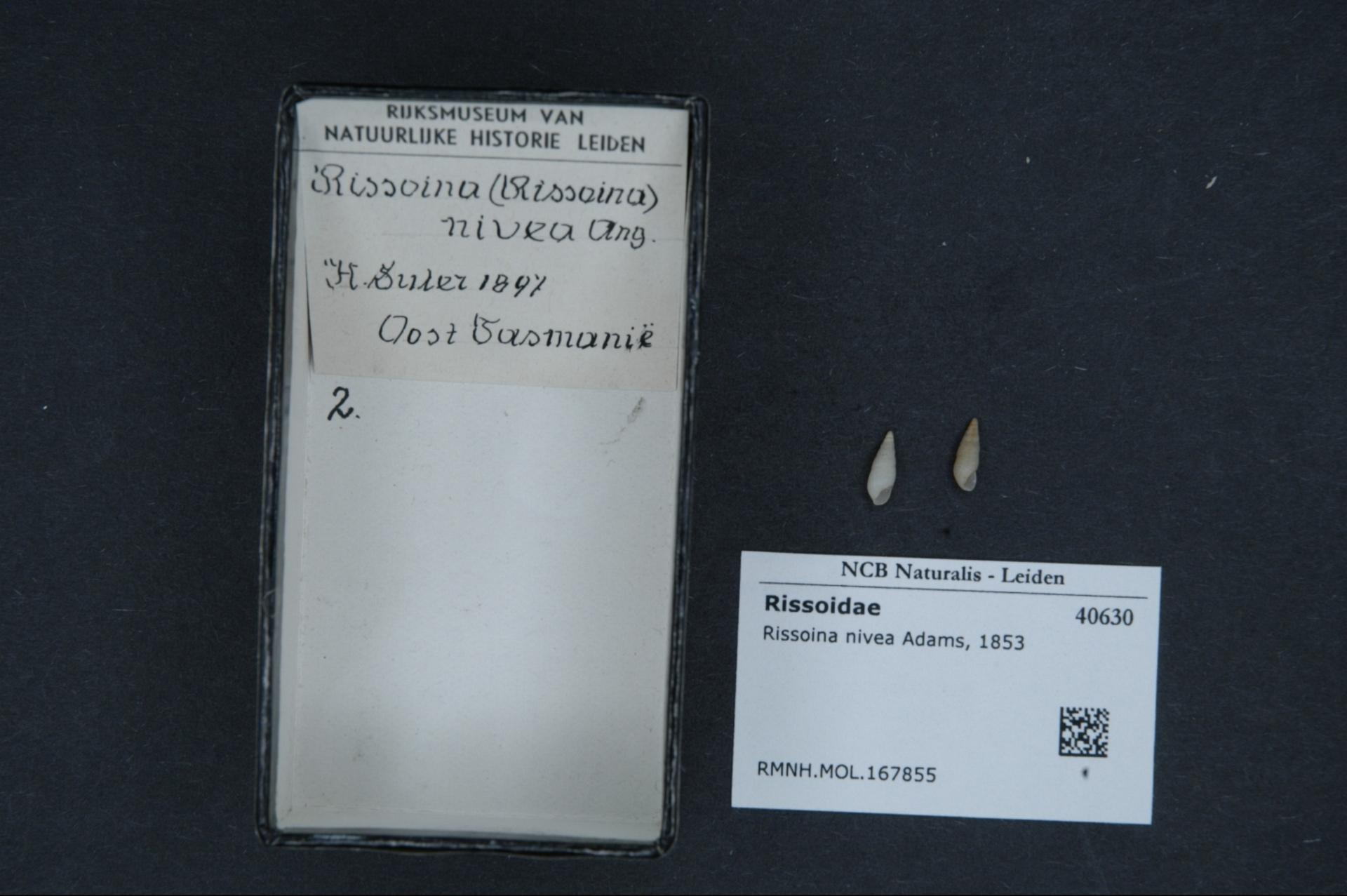

Scientific classification
- Kingdom: Animalia
- Phylum: Mollusca
- Class: Gastropoda
- Subclass: Caenogastropoda
- Order: Littorinimorpha
- Family: Rissoinidae
- Genus: Rissoina
- Species: R. nivea

Binomial name
- Rissoina nivea A. Adams, 1853

= Rissoina nivea =

Species of gastropod

Rissoina nivea is a species of small sea snail, a marine gastropod mollusk or micromollusk in the family Rissoinidae.

== Description ==
The height of the shell attains 6 mm.

== Distribution ==
This species occurs in the Red Sea and in the Indian Ocean off Réunion.
