= Rissoina smithi =

Scientific classification
- Kingdom: Animalia
- Phylum: Mollusca
- Class: Gastropoda
- Subclass: Caenogastropoda
- Order: Littorinimorpha
- Family: Rissoinidae
- Genus: Rissoina
- Species: R. smithi

Binomial name
- Rissoina smithi Angas, 1867

Species of gastropod

Rissoina smithi is a species of minute sea snail, a marine gastropod mollusc or micromollusc in the family Rissoinidae.

== Distribution ==
This species occurs in the Red Sea.
