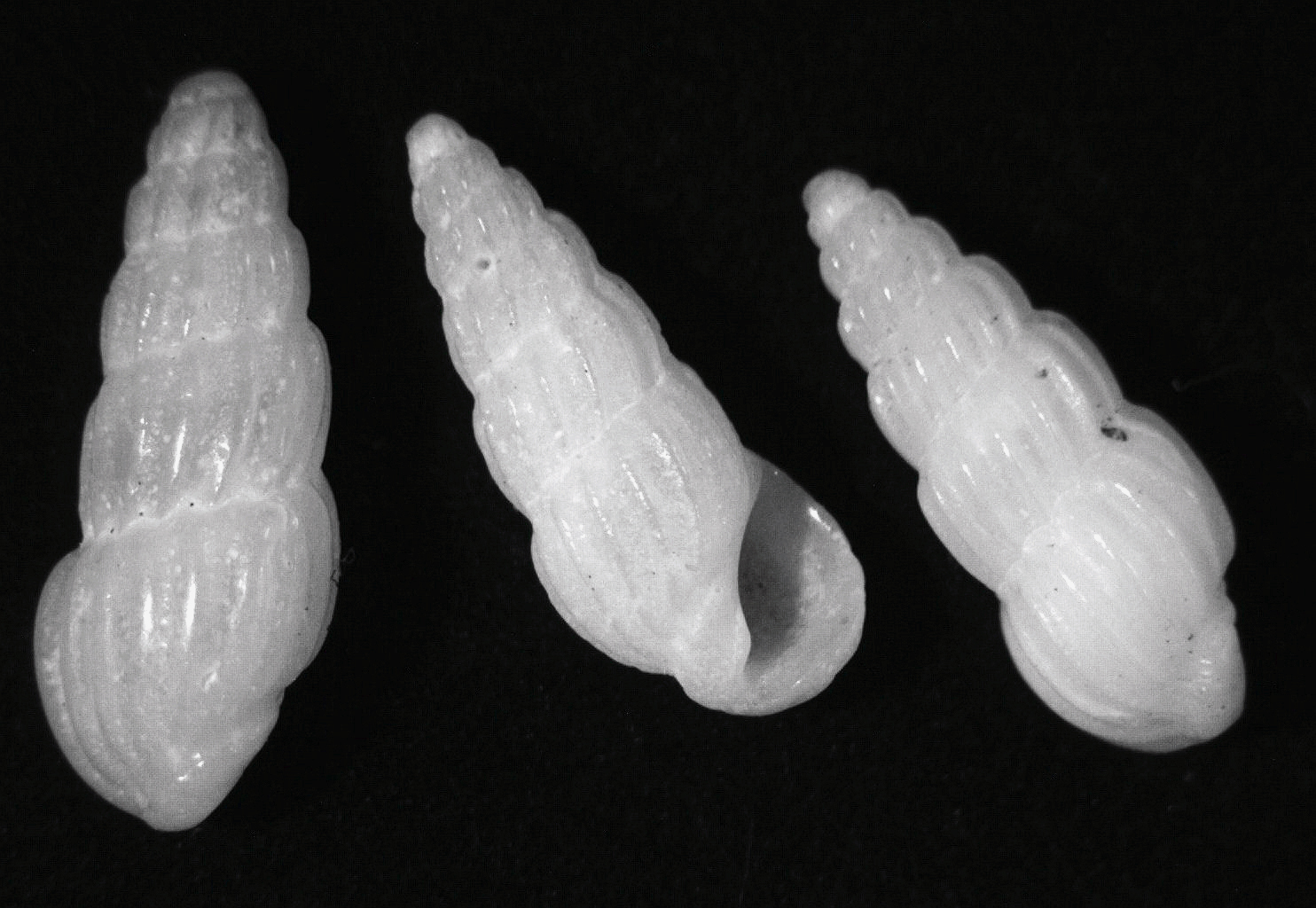
- Shell of Rissoina crassa

Scientific classification
- Kingdom: Animalia
- Phylum: Mollusca
- Class: Gastropoda
- Subclass: Caenogastropoda
- Order: Littorinimorpha
- Family: Rissoinidae
- Genus: Rissoina
- Species: R. crassa

Binomial name
- Rissoina crassa Angas, 1871

= Rissoina crassa =

Species of sea snail

Rissoina crassa is a species of minute sea snail, a marine gastropod mollusc in the family Rissoinidae.

== Description ==
The shell is up to 8 mm in length with a moderately convex spire. The shell is defined by axial ribs without spiral sculpture. The aperture is lens shaped with a broad anterior canal. The outer lip is large but not thick internally, defined by a varix externally. The color of the shell is white, becoming more opaque with age.

The protoconch has one whorl and the teleoconch has six to seven whorls.

(Original description) The shell is pyramidally ovate, thick, and whitish, featuring strong and distantly spaced longitudinal folds. There are seven to eight slightly rounded whorls, and the suture is impressed. The body whorl has a rounded ridge at its base, over which the longitudinal folds continue. The aperture is subovate and becomes strongly and obliquely sinuous at the front. The outer lip is sharp and is thickly variced behind, while the inner lip is thickened and sinuous.

== Distribution ==
This species has been found off the coast of Australia, specifically the provinces of Queensland and New South Wales.
