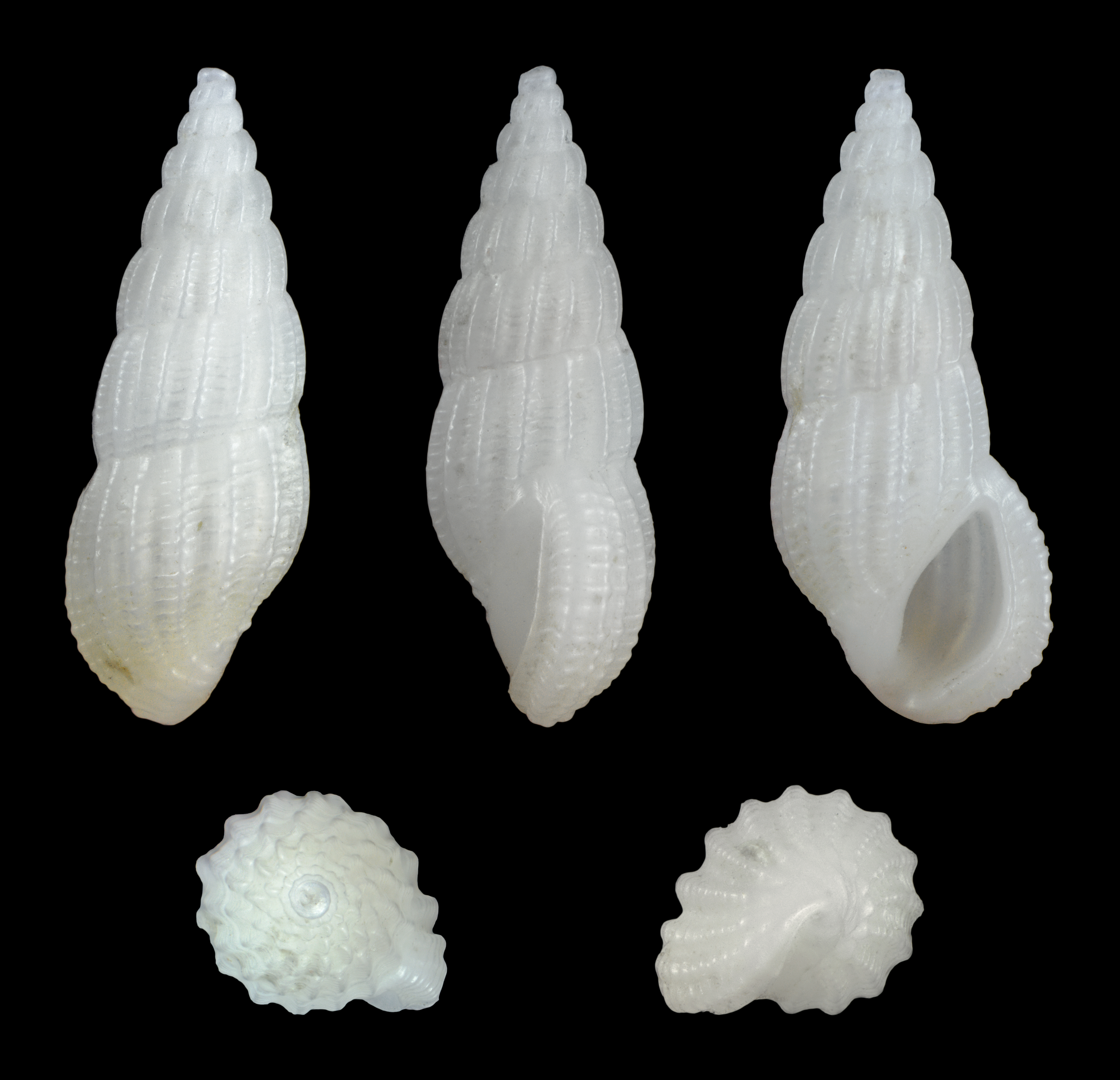

Scientific classification
- Kingdom: Animalia
- Phylum: Mollusca
- Class: Gastropoda
- Subclass: Caenogastropoda
- Order: Littorinimorpha
- Family: Rissoinidae
- Genus: Rissoina
- Species: R. bruguieri

Binomial name
- Rissoina bruguieri (Payraudeau, 1826)

Synonyms
- Mangelia poli Delle Chiaje, 1830; Mangelia poliana Risso, 1826; Mangelia reticulata Risso, 1826; Rissoa bruguieri Payraudeau, 1826; Rissoina bruguierei [sic] (widespread misspelling of bruguieri); Rissoina bruguieri var. minor Dautzenberg, 1883 (nomen nudum); Rissoina bruguieri var. perstriatulina Sacco, 1895; Rissoina bruguieri var. roseotincta Bucquoy, Dautzenberg & Dollfus, 1884; Rissoina bruguieri var. vindobonensis Sacco, 1895; Strombus reticulatus Megerle von Mühlfeld, 1824

= Rissoina bruguieri =

Species of gastropod

Rissoina bruguieri, common name Bruguiere's risso, is a species of small sea snail, a marine gastropod mollusk or micromollusk in the family Rissoinidae.

== Spelling ==
Specific name spelled bruguieri in text and bruguierii in the index, often misspelled (or emended?) bruguierei by subsequent authors following Schwartz (1860) and Locard (1886)

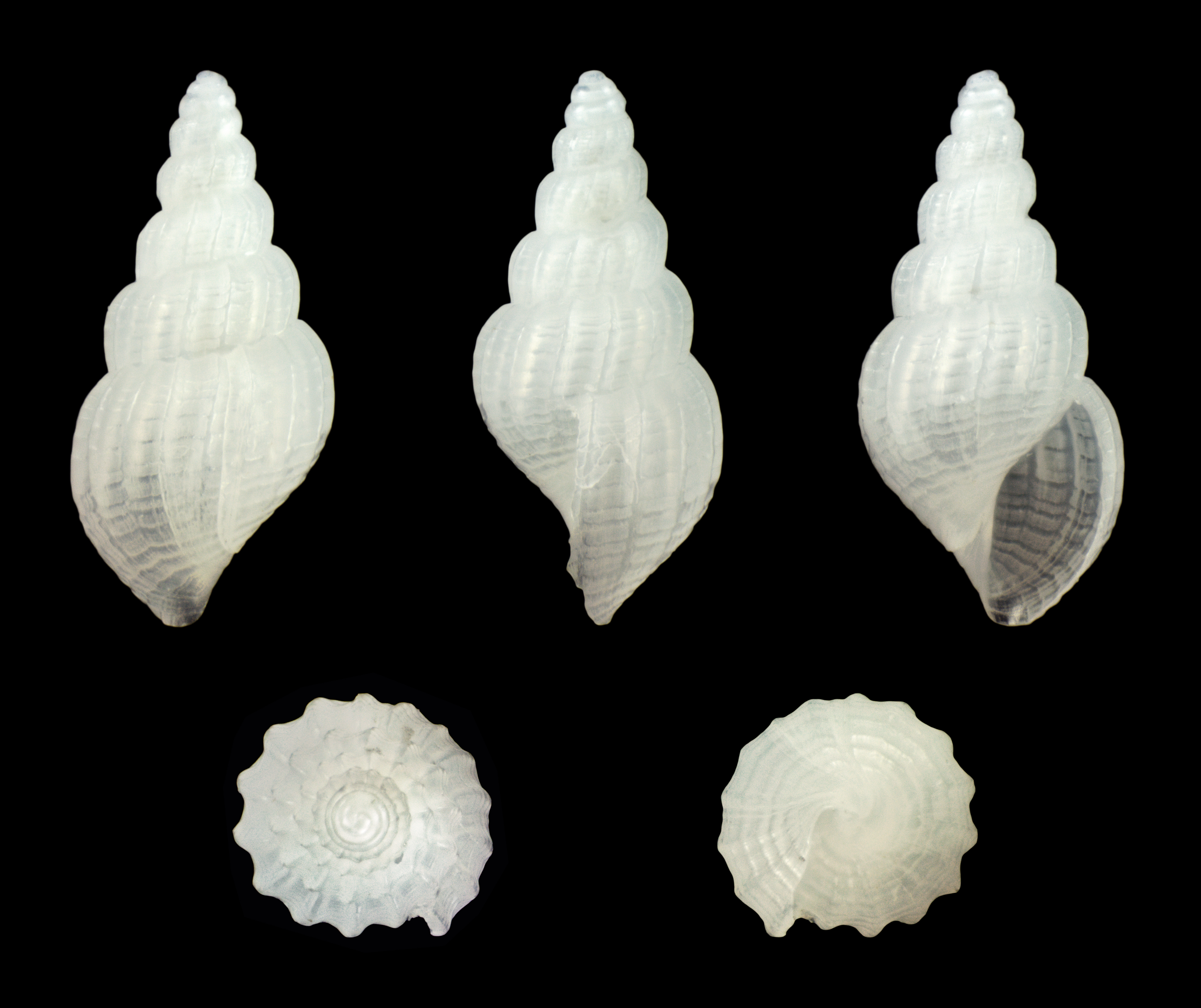
Juvenile shell

== Distribution ==
This species occurs in the Mediterranean Sea (Greece, south coast of Apulia)
