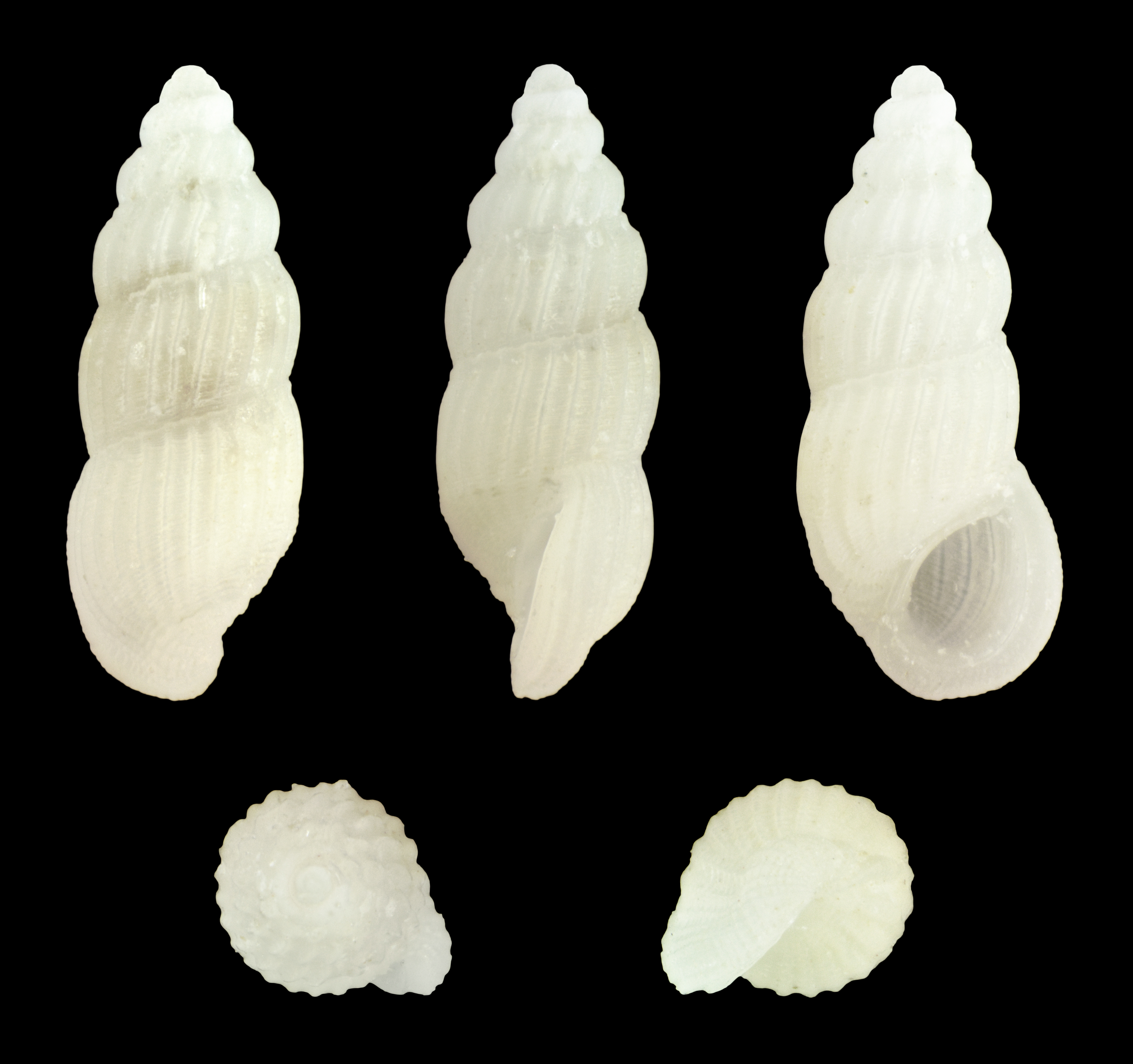

Scientific classification
- Kingdom: Animalia
- Phylum: Mollusca
- Class: Gastropoda
- Subclass: Caenogastropoda
- Order: Littorinimorpha
- Family: Rissoinidae
- Genus: Rissoina
- Species: R. multicostata

Binomial name
- Rissoina multicostata (C. B. Adams, 1850)

= Rissoina multicostata =

Species of gastropod

Rissoina multicostata is a species of minute sea snail, a marine gastropod mollusk or micromollusk in the family Rissoinidae.

== Distribution ==
This species occurs in the Caribbean Sea and the Gulf of Mexico.

== Description ==
The maximum recorded shell length is 5.2 mm.

== Habitat ==
Minimum recorded depth is 0 m. Maximum recorded depth is 525 m.
