= Phosinella fenestrata =

Scientific classification
- Kingdom: Animalia
- Phylum: Mollusca
- Class: Gastropoda
- Subclass: Caenogastropoda
- Order: Littorinimorpha
- Family: Rissoinidae
- Genus: Phosinella
- Species: P. fenestrata

Binomial name
- Phosinella fenestrata Gustav Schwartz, 1860

Synonyms
- Rissoina fenestrata Schwartz, 1860; Phosinella fenestrata Schwartz, 1860; Rissoina vanderspoeli auct. non Jong & Coomans, 1988

Species of gastropod

Phosinella fenestrata is a species of small sea snail, a marine gastropod mollusk or micromollusk in the family Rissoinidae.

== Distribution ==
This species occurs in the Caribbean Sea and the Gulf of Mexico; in the Indian Ocean off the Aldabra Atoll.

== Description ==
The maximum recorded shell length is 4.5 mm.

== Habitat ==
Minimum recorded depth is 52 m. Maximum recorded depth is 52 m.
