= Schwartziella triticea =

Scientific classification
- Kingdom: Animalia
- Phylum: Mollusca
- Class: Gastropoda
- Subclass: Caenogastropoda
- Order: Littorinimorpha
- Family: Zebinidae
- Genus: Schwartziella
- Species: S. triticea

Binomial name
- Schwartziella triticea Pease, 1861

Species of gastropod

Schwartziella triticea is a species of small sea snail, a marine gastropod mollusk or micromollusk in the family Rissoinidae.

== Distribution ==
This species occurs in the Red Sea and in the Indian Ocean off Madagascar.
