= Moerchiella bozzettii =

Scientific classification
- Kingdom: Animalia
- Phylum: Mollusca
- Class: Gastropoda
- Subclass: Caenogastropoda
- Order: Littorinimorpha
- Family: Rissoinidae
- Genus: Moerchiella
- Species: M. bozzettii

Binomial name
- Moerchiella bozzettii (Faber, 2015)

Synonyms
- Rissoina (Moerchiella) bozzettii Faber, 2015 ·; Rissoina (Moerchiella) cylindrica Bozzetti, 2009; Rissoina bozzettii Faber, 2015; Rissoina cylindrica Bozzetti, 2009 (invalid: junior homonym of Rissoina cylindrica Preston, 1908; R. bozzettii is a replacement name) ·

Species of gastropod

Moerchiella bozzettii is a species of tiny sea snail, a marine gastropod mollusc or micromollusc in the family Rissoinidae.

== Description ==
The height of the shell attains 10.5 mm.

== Distribution ==
This species occurs in the Indian Ocean off Madagascar.
