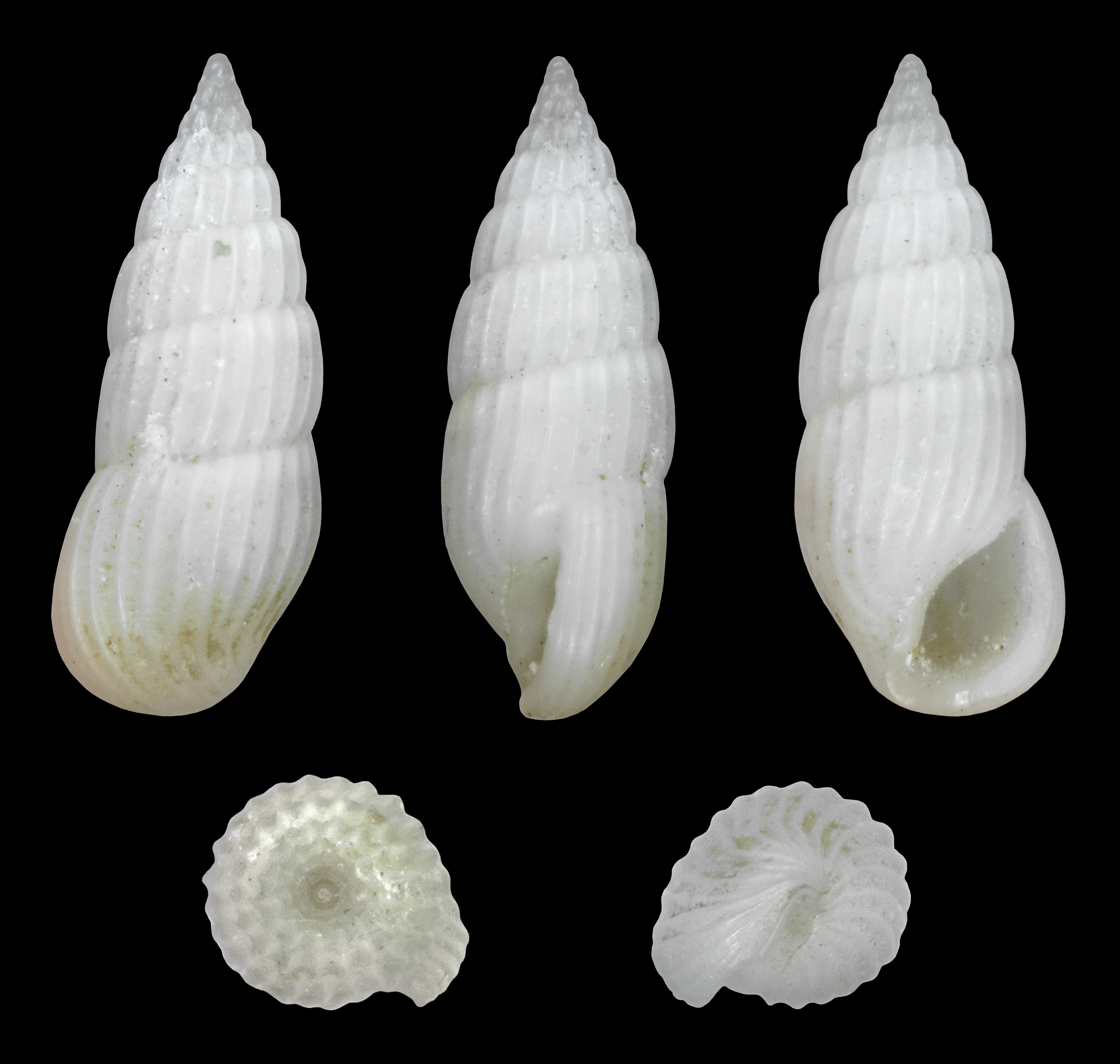
- A shell of Rissoina ambigua

Scientific classification
- Kingdom: Animalia
- Phylum: Mollusca
- Class: Gastropoda
- Subclass: Caenogastropoda
- Order: Littorinimorpha
- Family: Rissoinidae
- Genus: Rissoina
- Species: R. ambigua

Binomial name
- Rissoina ambigua (Gould, 1849)

Synonyms
- Peripetella immersa Laseron, C.F., 1956; Peripetella queenslandica Laseron, 1956; Rissoa multicostata Garrett, A., 1857; Rissoina costulifera Pease, W.H., 1862; Rissoina crebrecostata Thiele, J., 1930; Rissoina materinsulae Pilsbry, H.A., 1904; Rissoina pulchella Brazier, J., 1877; Rissoina pusilla Schwartz, G., 1860; Rissoina (Rissoina) ambigua parryensis Ladd, H.S., 1966

= Rissoina ambigua =

Species of gastropod

Rissoina ambigua is a species of small sea snail, a marine gastropod mollusk or micromollusk in the family Rissoinidae.

== Description ==
The shell grows to a height of 6 mm.

== Distribution ==
This marine species occurs in the Indo-Pacific.
