= Herewardia kesteveni =

Scientific classification
- Kingdom: Animalia
- Phylum: Mollusca
- Class: Gastropoda
- Family: Pyramidellidae
- Genus: Herewardia
- Species: H. kesteveni

Binomial name
- Herewardia kesteveni (Hedley, 1907)

Synonyms
- Rissoina kesteveni Hedley, 1907

Species of gastropod

Herewardia kesteveni is a species of sea snail, a marine gastropod mollusk in the family Pyramidellidae, the pyrams and their allies.
