= Pseudorissoina perexiguus =

Scientific classification
- Kingdom: Animalia
- Phylum: Mollusca
- Class: Gastropoda
- Family: Pyramidellidae
- Genus: Pseudorissoina
- Species: P. perexiguus

Binomial name
- Pseudorissoina perexiguus (Tate & May, 1900)

Synonyms
- Leiostraca perexiguus Tate & May, 1900; Pseudorissoina minutissima (Tenison Woods, 1878); Rissoina minutissima Tenison Woods, 1878

Species of gastropod

Pseudorissoina perexiguus is a species of sea snail, a marine gastropod mollusk in the family Pyramidellidae, the pyrams and their allies.
