= Rissoina sagraiana =

Scientific classification
- Kingdom: Animalia
- Phylum: Mollusca
- Class: Gastropoda
- Subclass: Caenogastropoda
- Order: Littorinimorpha
- Family: Rissoinidae
- Genus: Rissoina
- Species: R. sagraiana

Binomial name
- Rissoina sagraiana (d’Orbigny, 1842)

Synonyms
- Rissoa sagraiana d'Orbigny, 1842 (original description); Rissoina guppyi Cossmann, 1921; Rissoina rituola Woodring, 1928; Rissoina fargoi Olsson & Harbison, 1953

Species of gastropod

Rissoina sagraiana is a species of small sea snail, a marine gastropod mollusk or micromollusk in the family Rissoinidae.

== Spelling ==
Rissoina sagraiana is cited by Desjardin (1949 )as from 1853. The species was first published by D’Orbigny (1842) under the name Rissoina sagra in the caption of the plate and thereby made available under the provisions of article 12.2.7 of the International Code of Zoological Nomenclature; the complete description was published years later (1846) under the name Rissoina sagraiana and the publication in parts was completed only in 1853. Therefore, there are two different spellings of the name, but according to article 32.5.1.1 of the ICZN, correction of the spelling of a name in a later part of a work published in parts constitutes an evidence for an inadverted error and therefore, the species must be cited as Rissoina sagraiana d’Orbigny, 1842 having priority over Rissoina cancellata Philippi, 1847.

== Distribution ==
This species occurs in the Caribbean Sea, the Gulf of Mexico and the Lesser Antilles.

== Description ==
The maximum recorded shell length is 5.8 mm.

== Habitat ==
Minimum recorded depth is 0 m. Maximum recorded depth is 128 m.
