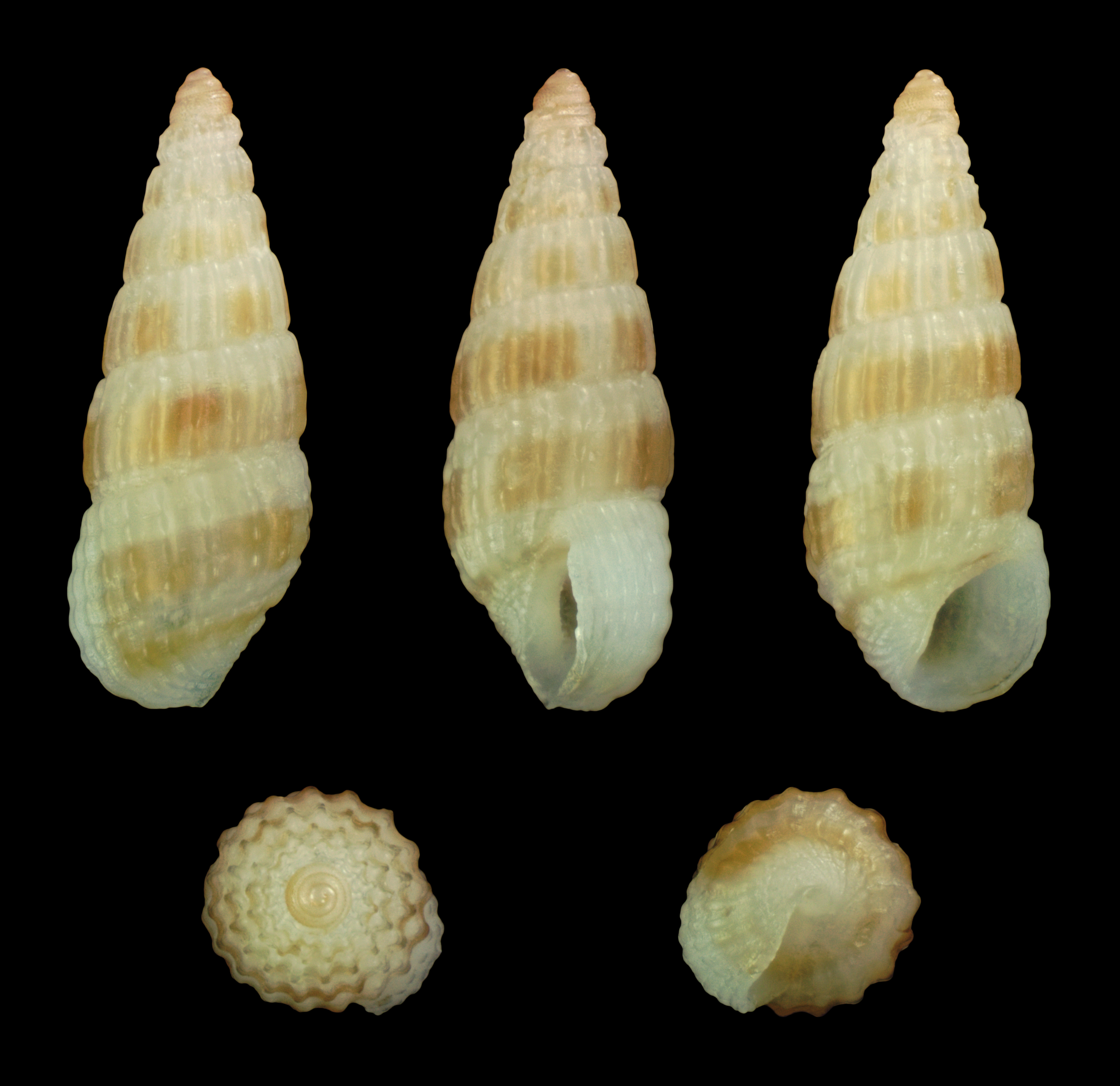

Scientific classification
- Kingdom: Animalia
- Phylum: Mollusca
- Class: Gastropoda
- Subclass: Caenogastropoda
- Order: Littorinimorpha
- Family: Rissoinidae
- Genus: Apataxia
- Species: A. cerithiiformis

Binomial name
- Apataxia cerithiiformis (Tryon, 1887)

Synonyms
- Apataxia erecta Laseron, 1956; Rissoina (Apataxia) cerithiiformis Tryon, 1887; Rissoina (Apataxia) erecta Laseron, C.F., 1956; Rissoina costulata Pease, 1867 (Invalid: junior homonym of Rissoina costulata Dunker, 1859; Rissoina harperi is a replacement name); Rissoina harperi Dautzenberg & Bouge, 1933; Rissoina miltozona Tomlin, 1915

= Apataxia cerithiiformis =

Species of gastropod

Apataxia cerithiiformis is a species of small sea snail, a marine gastropod mollusk or micromollusk in the family Rissoinidae.

== Distribution ==
This species occurs in the Red Sea and in the Western and Central Pacific.
