= Ailinzebina onobiformis =

Scientific classification
- Kingdom: Animalia
- Phylum: Mollusca
- Class: Gastropoda
- Subclass: Caenogastropoda
- Order: Littorinimorpha
- Family: Rissoinidae
- Genus: Ailinzebina
- Species: A. onobiformis

Binomial name
- Ailinzebina onobiformis (Rolán & Luque, 2000)

Synonyms
- Rissoina onobiformis Rolán & Luque, 2000; Rissoina (Ailinzebina) onobiformis Rolán & Luque, 2000

Species of gastropod

Ailinzebina onobiformis is a species of small sea snail, a marine gastropod mollusk or micromollusk in the family Rissoinidae. These snails are part of the micromollusk group, meaning they are extremely tiny, often less than a few millimeters in size. Like other members of their family, they typically inhabit shallow marine environments and are found in sandy or coral-rich coastal areas.

== Description ==
The height of the shell attains 3.5 mm.

== Distribution ==
This species occurs in the Atlantic Ocean on the coast of the Cape Verde islands.
