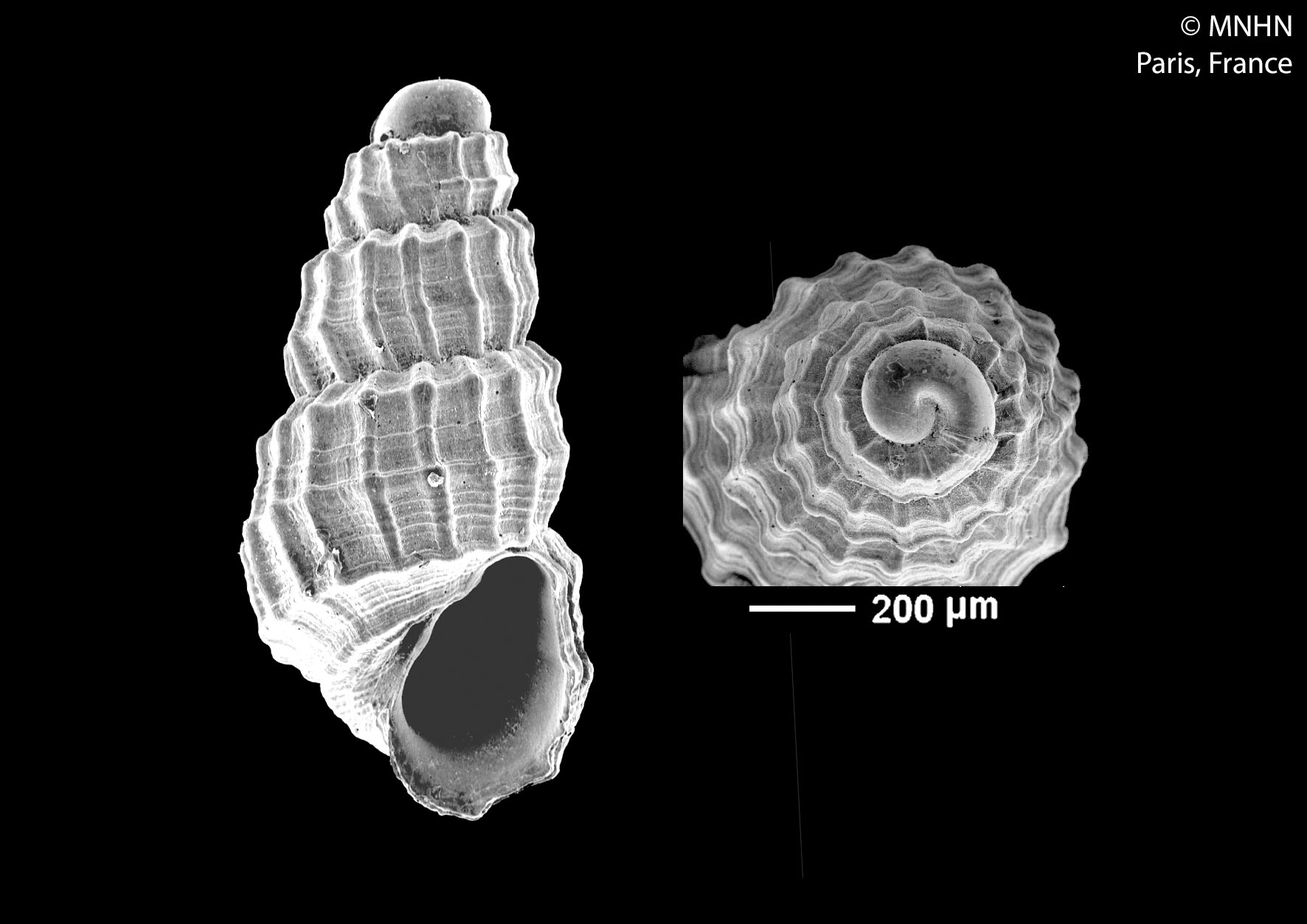
- Shell of Costabieta horrida (specimen at MNHN, Paris)

Scientific classification
- Kingdom: Animalia
- Phylum: Mollusca
- Class: Gastropoda
- Family: Pyramidellidae
- Genus: Costabieta
- Species: C. horrida

Binomial name
- Costabieta horrida (Garrett, 1873)

Synonyms
- Costabieta paucina Laseron, 1956; Rissiona baxteriana Nevill, 1881; Rissoina horrida Garrett, 1873

= Costabieta horrida =

Species of gastropod

Costabieta horrida is a species of sea snail, a marine gastropod mollusc in the family Pyramidellidae, the pyrams and their allies. This species has three synonyms, two within the genus Rissiona and one within Costabieta.

== Distribution ==
This species occurs in the Red Sea, the Central and East Indian Ocean, the Western Pacific Ocean, off Malaysia and Indo-China.
