= Ailinzebina elegantissima =

Scientific classification
- Kingdom: Animalia
- Phylum: Mollusca
- Class: Gastropoda
- Subclass: Caenogastropoda
- Order: Littorinimorpha
- Family: Rissoinidae
- Genus: Ailinzebina
- Species: A. elegantissima

Binomial name
- Ailinzebina elegantissima (d’Orbigny, 1842)

Synonyms
- Truncatella caribaensis auct. non Reeve, 1842; Rissoa elegantissima d'Orbigny, 1842 (original combination); Rissoina elegantissima (d'Orbigny, 1842); Rissoina (Ailinzebina) elegantissima (d’Orbigny, 1842)

Species of gastropod

Ailinzebina elegantissima is a species of small sea snail, a marine gastropod mollusk or micromollusk in the family Rissoinidae. The species name is Latin for "most elegant".

== Description ==
The maximum recorded shell length is 3.75 mm.

== Distribution ==
This species occurs in the Caribbean Sea, the Gulf of Mexico and the Lesser Antilles.

== Habitat ==
Minimum recorded depth is 0 m. Maximum recorded depth is 128 m.
