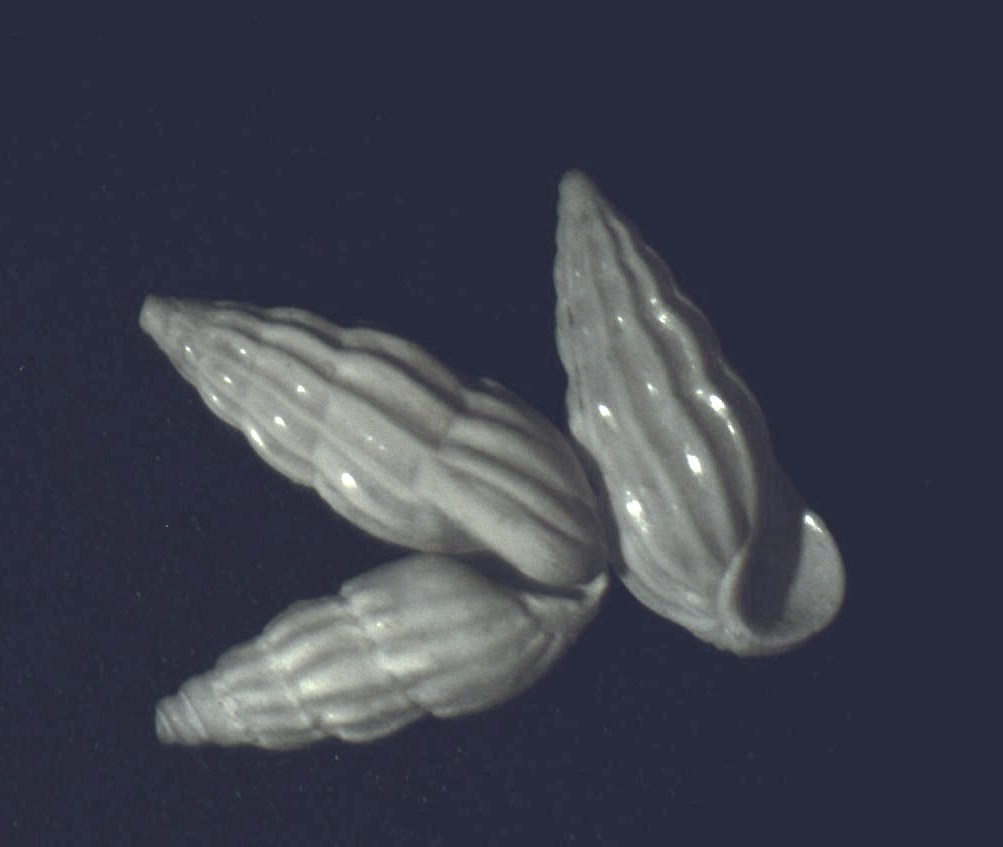
- Three shells of Schwartziella catesbyana

Scientific classification
- Kingdom: Animalia
- Phylum: Mollusca
- Class: Gastropoda
- Subclass: Caenogastropoda
- Order: Littorinimorpha
- Family: Zebinidae
- Genus: Schwartziella; G. Nevill, 1881

Type species
- Rissoina orientalis G. Nevill, 1881

Synonyms
- Atlantorissoina Kosuge, 1965; Pandalosia Laseron, 1956; Schwartziella (Pandalosia) Laseron, 1956

= Schwartziella =

Genus of gastropods

Schwartziella is a genus of minute sea snails, marine gastropod mollusks or micromollusks in the family Zebinidae.

The generic name Schwartziella is in honor of Gustav Franziskus Maria Schwartz von Mohrenstern.

== Distribution ==
Schwartziella species have been found in the Atlantic Ocean, including the Caribbean, the Gulf of Mexico and Cape Verde, in the Indian Ocean, around Australia and New Zealand and in the Pacific Ocean.

== Species ==
Species within the genus Schwartziella include:

- Schwartziella abacocubensis Espinosa & Ortea, 2002
- Schwartziella abundata Rolán & Luque, 2000
- Schwartziella africana (Dautzenberg, 1912)
- Schwartziella angularis Rolán & Luque, 2000
- Schwartziella bakeri (Bartsch, 1902)
- † Schwartziella bicrepida (Weisbord, 1962)
- Schwartziella bouryi (Desjardin, 1949) (taxon inquirendum, Original name is a primary homonym of Rissoina clavula bouryi Cossmann, 1888)
- Schwartziella bryerea (Montagu, 1803)
- Schwartziella burragei (Bartsch, 1915)
- Schwartziella californica (Bartsch, 1915)
- Schwartziella cancapae Rolán & Luque, 2000
- Schwartziella catesbyana (d’Orbigny, 1842)
- Schwartziella chesnelii (Michaud, 1830)
- Schwartziella clandestina (C. B. Adams, 1852)
- Schwartziella cleo (Bartsch, 1915)
- Schwartziella congenita (E. A. Smith, 1890)
- Schwartziella corrugata Rolán & Luque, 2000
- Schwartziella crassior (Dautzenberg, 1912)
- Schwartziella curtispira Paulmier, 2017
- Schwartziella dalli (Bartsch, 1915)
- Schwartziella depressa Rolán & Luque, 2000
- Schwartziella desjardini (Faber, 2017)
- Schwartziella dubiosa (C. B. Adams, 1850)
- Schwartziella effusa (Mörch, 1860)
- Schwartziella ephamilla (Watson, 1886)
- Schwartziella excelsis (Laseron, 1956)
- Schwartziella firmata (C. B. Adams, 1852)
- Schwartziella fischeri (Desjardin, 1949)
- Schwartziella fiscina (Cotton, 1952)
- Schwartziella floridana (Olsson & Harbison, 1953)
- Schwartziella fulgida Rolán & Luque, 2000
- Schwartziella gibbera Rolán & Luque, 2000
- Schwartziella gradata Rolán & Luque, 2000
- Schwartziella grata (Cotton, 1952)
- Schwartziella guadeloupensis Paulmier, 2017
- Schwartziella guyanensis Faber, 2018
- Schwartziella hannai (Smith & Gordon, 1948)
- † Schwartziella harpa (Gardner, 1948)
- Schwartziella helenae (E. A. Smith, 1890)
- Schwartziella hoenselaari Rolán & Luque, 2000
- Schwartziella inconspicua (Brazier, 1877)
- Schwartziella inscripta Rolán & Luque, 2000
- Schwartziella irregularis Rolán & Luque, 2000
- Schwartziella laseroni (Chang & Wu, 2004)
- Schwartziella lata Laseron, 1956
- Schwartziella leucophanes (Tomlin, 1931)
- Schwartziella luisalvarezi Rolán & Fernández-Garcés, 2010
- Schwartziella luisi Rolán & Luque, 2000
- Schwartziella lutaoi (Chang & Wu, 2004)
- † Schwartziella maiquetiana (Weisbord, 1962)
- Schwartziella mellissi (E. A. Smith, 1890)
- Schwartziella minima Rolán & Luque, 2000
- Schwartziella minor (C. B. Adams, 1850)
- Schwartziella minuta (Nevill, 1874)
- Schwartziella mizunamiensis (Itoigawa & Nishimoto, 1984)
- Schwartziella moerchiella (Chang & Wu, 2004)
- Schwartziella nereina (Bartsch, 1915)
- Schwartziella newcombei (Dall, 1897)
- Schwartziella obesa Rolán & Luque, 2000
- Schwartziella orientalis (G. Nevill, 1881)
- Schwartziella paradoxa Rolán & Luque, 2000
- Schwartziella paucicostata Rolán & Luque, 2000
- Schwartziella pavita Rolán & Luque, 2000
- Schwartziella peregrina Gofas, 2007
- Schwartziella puncticulata Rolán & Luque, 2000
- Schwartziella rarilineata Rolán & Luque, 2000
- Schwartziella rectilinea Rolán & Luque, 2000
- Schwartziella robusta Rolán & Luque, 2000
- Schwartziella sanmartini Rolán & Luque, 2000
- Schwartziella scalarella (C. B. Adams, 1845)
- Schwartziella scalarioides (Philippi, 1848)
- Schwartziella scissurata Paulmier, 2017
- Schwartziella sculpturata Rolán & Luque, 2000
- Schwartziella similiter Rolán & Luque, 2000
- Schwartziella sulcostriata Rolán & Luque, 2000
- Schwartziella triticea (Pease, 1861)
- Schwartziella turtoni (E. A. Smith, 1890)
- Schwartziella typica Rolán & Luque, 2000
- Schwartziella vanpeli (De Jong & Coomans, 1988)
- † Schwartziella venezuelana (Weisbord, 1962)
- Schwartziella willetti (Strong, 1938)
- Schwartziella woodwardii (Carpenter, 1857)
- Schwartziella yoguii Rolán & Fernández-Garcés, 2010
- Schwartziella yragoae Rolán & Hernández, 2003
- Schwartziella zeltnerioides (Yokoyama, 1920)

Species brought into synonymy

- Schwartziella bilabiata (Boettger, 1893): synonym of Ailinzebina bilabiata (Boettger, 1893)
- Schwartziella coronadoensis (Bartsch, 1915): synonym of Rissoina coronadensis Bartsch, 1915
- Schwartziella darwinensis (Laseron, 1956): synonym of Pandalosia darwinensis Laseron, 1956:synonym of Pandalosia subfirmata (O. Boettger, 1887) (Pandalosia accepted as full genus)
- Schwartziella delicatula (Laseron, 1956): synonym of Pandalosia delicatula Laseron, 1956
- Schwartziella ephamilla (R. B. Watson, 1886) accepted as Pandalosia ephamilla (R. B. Watson, 1886)
- Schwartziella excelsis (Laseron, 1956) accepted as Pandalosia excelsis Laseron, 1956 accepted as Pandalosia subfirmata (O. Boettger, 1887)
- Schwartziella laevissima (C. B. Adams, 1850): synonym of Zebina browniana (d'Orbigny, 1842) (does not belong to Schwartziella)
- Schwartziella lutaoi (C.-K. Chang & W.-L. Wu, 2004) accepted as Pandalosia lutaoi C.-K. Chang & W.-L. Wu, 2004
- Schwartziella minuta (G. Nevill & H. Nevill, 1874) accepted as Pandalosia minuta (G. Nevill & H. Nevill, 1874) (Pandalosia accepted as genus)
- Schwartziella mizunamiensis (Itoigawa & Nishimoto, 1984) accepted as Pandalosia mizunamiensis Itoigawa & Nishimoto, 1984 accepted as Pandalosia ephamilla (R. B. Watson, 1886) (Pandalosia accepted as full genus)
- Schwartziella moerchiella (C.-K. Chang & W.-L. Wu, 2004) accepted as Pandalosia moerchiella C.-K. Chang & W.-L. Wu, 2004 (Does not belong to Schwartziella; identification uncertain; recorded as basionym)
- Schwartziella nicaobesa Rolán & Fernández-Garcés, 2010: synonym of Rissoina nicaobesa Rolán & Fernández-Garcés, 2010
- Schwartziella obtusa (Laseron, 1956): synonym of Pandalosia subfirmata (O. Boettger, 1887)
- Schwartziella rietensis (Turton, 1932): synonym of Rissoina rietensis Turton, 1932
- Schwartziella scalariformis (R. B. Watson, 1886) accepted as Schwartziella ephamilla (R. B. Watson, 1886) accepted as Pandalosia ephamilla (R. B. Watson, 1886) (primary junior homonym, replaced by the author)
- Schwartziella scalariformis (Watson, 1886): synonym of Schwartziella firmata (C. B. Adams, 1852)
- Schwartziella scalaroides (C. B. Adams, 1850): synonym of Schwartziella chesnelii (Michaud, 1830)
- Schwartziella subangulata (C. B. Adams, 1850): synonym of Schwartziella bryerea (Montagu, 1803)
- Schwartziella subfirmata (Boettger, 1887): synonym of Pandalosia subfirmata (O. Boettger, 1887)
- Schwartziella subulata(Laseron, 1956): synonym of Pandalosia subulata Laseron, 1956
