= Schwartziella chesnelii =

Scientific classification
- Kingdom: Animalia
- Phylum: Mollusca
- Class: Gastropoda
- Subclass: Caenogastropoda
- Order: Littorinimorpha
- Family: Zebinidae
- Genus: Schwartziella
- Species: S. chesnelii

Binomial name
- Schwartziella chesnelii (Michaud, 1830)

Synonyms
- Rissoa chesnelii Michaud, 1830 (original combination)

Species of gastropod

Schwartziella chesnelii is a species of small sea snail. This is a marine gastropod mollusk or micromollusk in the family Zebinidae.

== Distribution ==
This species occurs in the Gulf of Mexico, the Caribbean Sea and the Lesser Antilles; in the Atlantic Ocean off North Carolina.

== Description ==
The maximum recorded shell length is 6 mm.

== Habitat ==
Minimum recorded depth is 4 m. Maximum recorded depth is 57 m.
