= Folinia =

Scientific classification
- Kingdom: Animalia
- Phylum: Mollusca
- Class: Gastropoda
- Subclass: Caenogastropoda
- Order: Littorinimorpha
- Family: Zebinidae
- Genus: Folinia; Crosse, 1868

Type species
- Folinia signae de Folin, 1867

Genus of gastropods

Folinia is a genus of minute sea snails, marine gastropod mollusks or micromollusks in the family Zebinidae.

== Species ==
Species within the genus Folinia include:

- Folinia ericana (Hertlein & Strong, 1951)
- Folinia mottezi (Bavay, 1917)
- Folinia signae (Bartsch, 1915)

Species brought into synonymy

- Folinia bermudezi (Aguayo & Rehder, 1936): synonym of Mirarissoina bermudezi (Aguayo & Rehder, 1936)
- Folinia histia (Bartsch, 1915): synonym of Mirarissoina histia (Bartsch, 1915)
