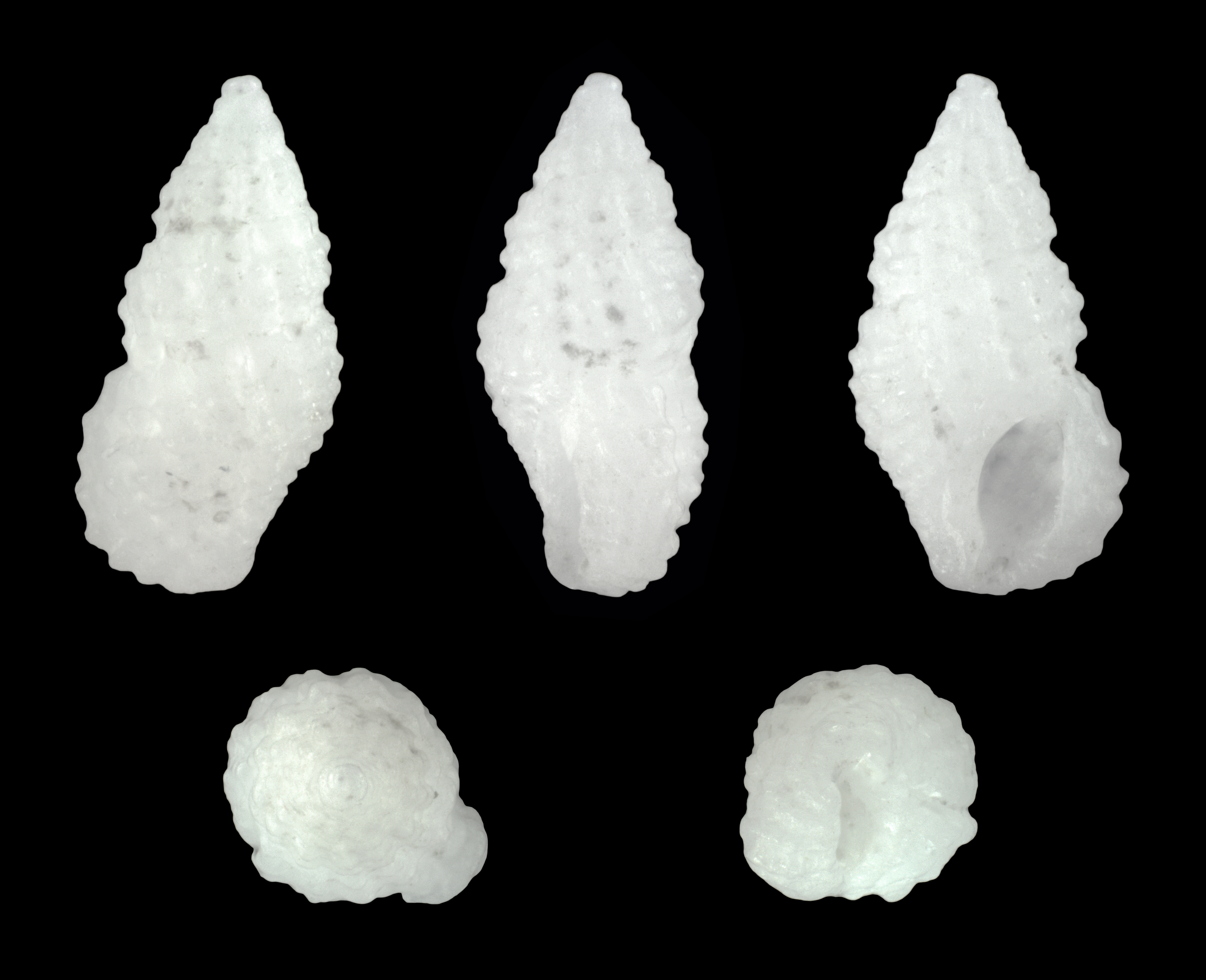

Scientific classification
- Kingdom: Animalia
- Phylum: Mollusca
- Class: Gastropoda
- Subclass: Caenogastropoda
- Order: Littorinimorpha
- Family: Zebinidae
- Genus: Stosicia
- Species: S. houbricki

Binomial name
- Stosicia houbricki Sleurs, 1996

= Stosicia houbricki =

Species of gastropod

Stosicia houbricki is a species of minute sea snail, a marine gastropod mollusk or micromollusk in the family Zebinidae.

== Distribution ==
This species occurs in the Caribbean Sea off Belize.

== Description ==
The maximum recorded shell length is 4.3 mm.

== Habitat ==
Minimum recorded depth is 0 m. Maximum recorded depth is 35 m.
