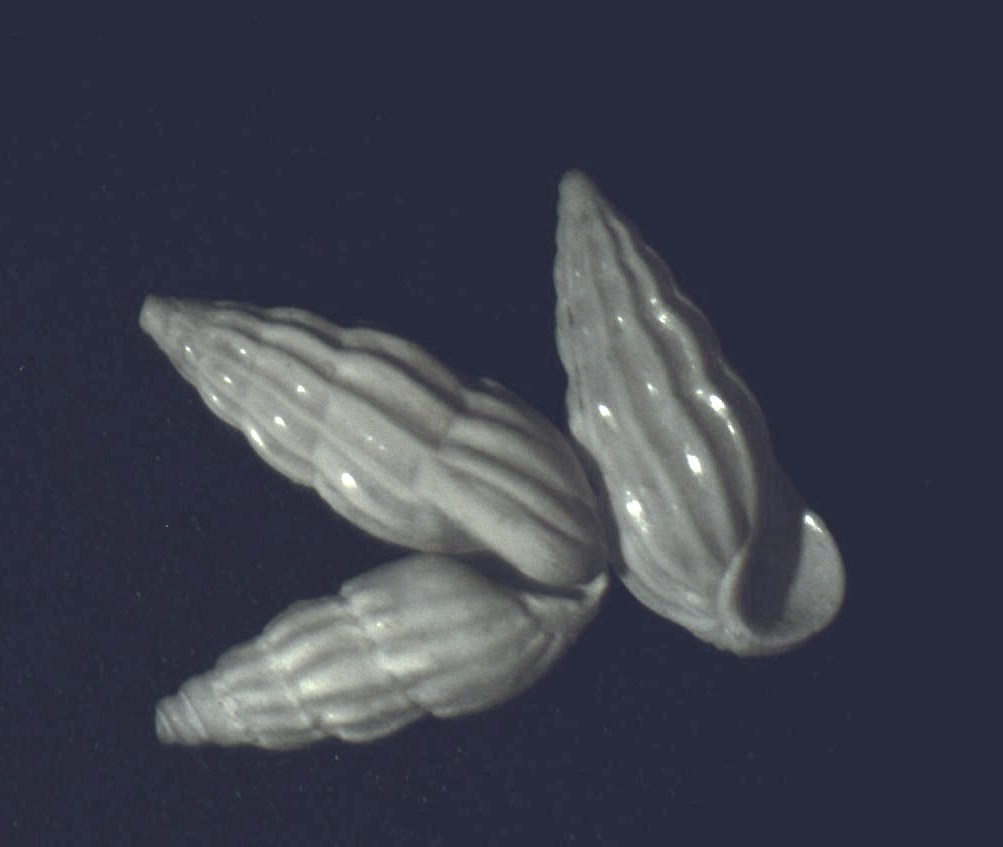
- Three shells of Schwartziella catesbyana

Scientific classification
- Kingdom: Animalia
- Phylum: Mollusca
- Class: Gastropoda
- Subclass: Caenogastropoda
- Order: Littorinimorpha
- Family: Zebinidae
- Genus: Schwartziella
- Species: S. catesbyana

Binomial name
- Schwartziella catesbyana (d’Orbigny, 1842)

Synonyms
- Rissoa catesbyana d’Orbigny, 1842 (original combination)

= Schwartziella catesbyana =

Species of gastropod

Schwartziella catesbyana, common name Catesby's risso, is a species of small sea snail, a marine gastropod mollusk or micromollusk in the family Zebinidae.

== Distribution ==
This species occurs in the Caribbean Sea and the Gulf of Mexico, in the Atlantic Ocean along the Mid-Atlantic Ridge and North Carolina to eastern Brazil.

== Description ==
The size of the shell varies between 2 mm and 7 mm.

== Habitat ==
The minimum recorded depth for this species is 0 m; maximum recorded depth is 40 m.
