= Zebina unamae =

Scientific classification
- Kingdom: Animalia
- Phylum: Mollusca
- Class: Gastropoda
- Subclass: Caenogastropoda
- Order: Littorinimorpha
- Family: Zebinidae
- Genus: Zebina
- Species: Z. unamae

Binomial name
- Zebina unamae Rolan, 1998

Species of gastropod

Zebina unamae is a species of small sea snail, a marine gastropod mollusk or micromollusk in the family Zebinidae.

== Description ==
The height of the shell attains 1.9 mm.

== Distribution ==
This species occurs in the Caribbean Sea off Yucatan, Mexico.
