= Zebina sloaniana =

Scientific classification
- Kingdom: Animalia
- Phylum: Mollusca
- Class: Gastropoda
- Subclass: Caenogastropoda
- Order: Littorinimorpha
- Family: Zebinidae
- Genus: Zebina
- Species: Z. sloaniana

Binomial name
- Zebina sloaniana (d'Orbigny, 1842)

Synonyms
- Rissoina sloaniana d'Orbigny, 1842 (The description strongly suggests that it belongs to the genus Zebina); Zebina laevigata (C. B. Adams, 1850)

Species of gastropod

Zebina sloaniana is a species of sea snail, a marine gastropod mollusk or micromollusk in the family Zebinidae.

== Distribution ==
This species occurs in the Caribbean Sea, the Gulf of Mexico and the Lesser Antilles; in the Atlantic Ocean off North Carolina.

== Description ==
The maximum recorded shell length is 5 mm.

== Habitat ==
Minimum recorded depth is 0 m. Maximum recorded depth is 23 m.
