= Stosicia aberrans =

Scientific classification
- Kingdom: Animalia
- Phylum: Mollusca
- Class: Gastropoda
- Subclass: Caenogastropoda
- Order: Littorinimorpha
- Family: Zebinidae
- Genus: Stosicia
- Species: S. aberrans

Binomial name
- Stosicia aberrans (C. B. Adams, 1850)

Synonyms
- Rissoa aberrans C. B. Adams, 1850 (original combination); Stossichia serrei Bavay, 1922

Species of gastropod

Stosicia aberrans is a species of minute sea snail, a marine gastropod mollusk or micromollusk in the family Zebinidae.

== Distribution ==
This species occurs in the Caribbean Sea (Belize, Colombia, Costa Rica, Mexico, Panama) the Gulf of Mexico (Cuba, Jamaica) and the Lesser Antilles, Puerto Rico and off north-eastern Brazil.

== Description ==
The maximum recorded shell length is 6 mm.

== Habitat ==
Minimum recorded depth is 0 m. Maximum recorded depth is 93 m.
