= Schwartziella abacocubensis =

Scientific classification
- Kingdom: Animalia
- Phylum: Mollusca
- Class: Gastropoda
- Subclass: Caenogastropoda
- Order: Littorinimorpha
- Family: Zebinidae
- Genus: Schwartziella
- Species: S. abacocubensis

Binomial name
- Schwartziella abacocubensis Espinosa & Ortea, 2002

Species of gastropod

Schwartziella abacocubensis is a species of minute sea snail, a marine gastropod mollusk or micromollusk in the family Zebinidae.

== Distribution ==
This species occurs in the Gulf of Mexico, the Caribbean Sea off Cuba and the Atlantic Ocean off the Bahamas.

== Description ==
The maximum recorded shell length is 4 mm.

== Habitat ==
Minimum recorded depth is 0 m. Maximum recorded depth is 18 m.
