= Schwartziella peregrina =

Scientific classification
- Kingdom: Animalia
- Phylum: Mollusca
- Class: Gastropoda
- Subclass: Caenogastropoda
- Order: Littorinimorpha
- Family: Zebinidae
- Genus: Schwartziella
- Species: S. peregrina

Binomial name
- Schwartziella peregrina Gofas, 2007

Species of gastropod

Schwartziella peregrina is a species of small sea snail, a marine gastropod mollusk or micromollusk in the family Zebinidae.

== Description ==
The very slender shell attains a height between 5.2 mm and 6.6 mm. The protoconch contains 1.5 whorl and the teleoconch ca. 7.5 whorls. The protoconch is smooth. The teleoconch shows strong, opisthocline, slightly flexuous axial ribs (ca. 14 on the penultimate whorl), equivalent in size to the interspaces; and a complex spiral microsculpture of longitudinal slots which are offset along the growth lines. The outer lip is opisthocline, strongly thickened externally, inside smooth, with a sharp edge. The inner lip is slightly thickened and appressed. This species differs from several West African species of Schwartziella in being much more slender than any of them.

== Distribution ==
This species occurs off the Great Meteor Seamount in the Northeast Atlantic Ocean.
