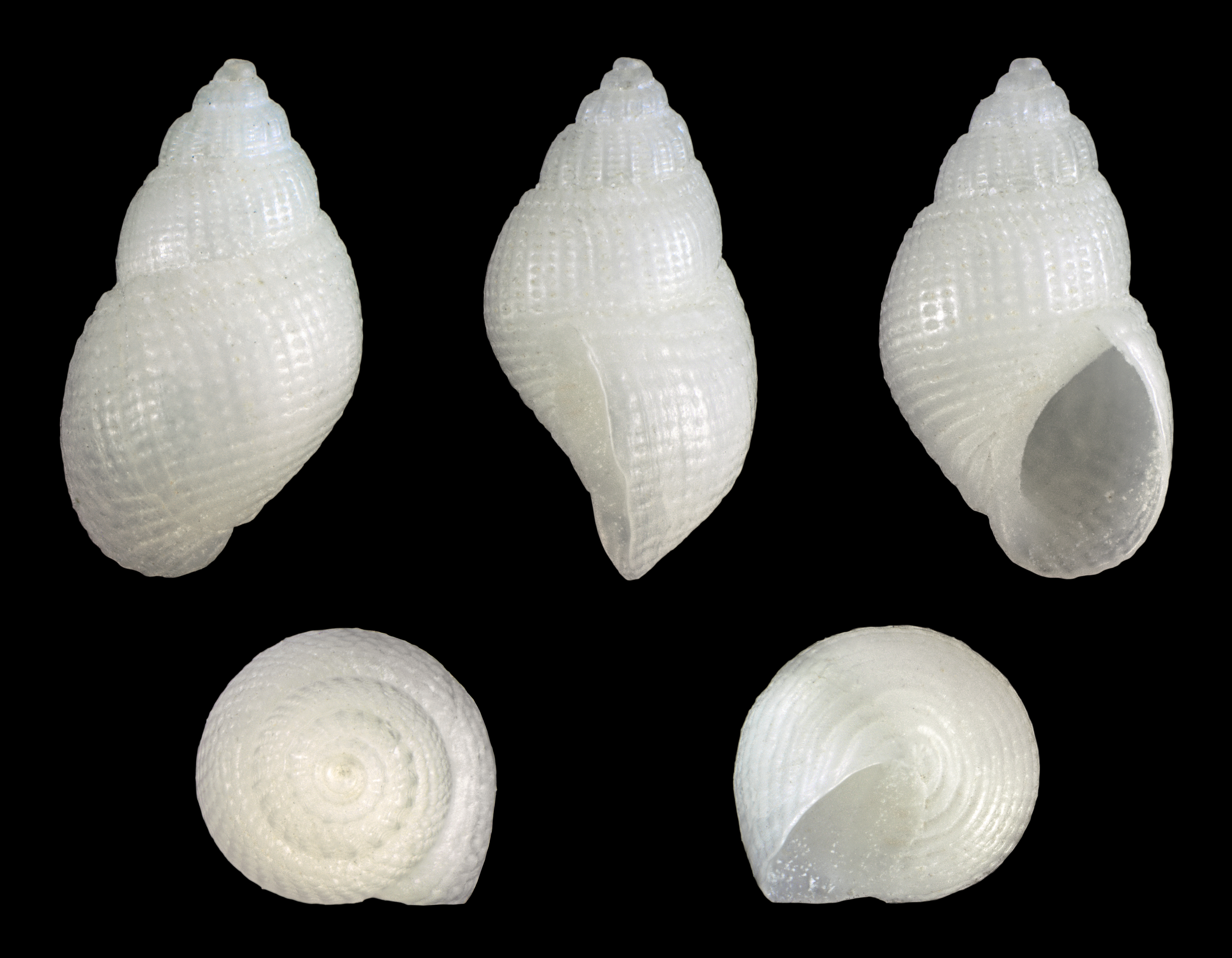

Scientific classification
- Kingdom: Animalia
- Phylum: Mollusca
- Class: Gastropoda
- Subclass: Caenogastropoda
- Order: Littorinimorpha
- Family: Rissoidae
- Genus: Alvania
- Species: A. lactea

Binomial name
- Alvania lactea (Michaud, 1832)

Synonyms
- Massotia dajerleini Monterosato, 1889; Massotia lactea (Michaud, 1830) superseded combination; Massotia textilis (R. A. Philippi, 1844) sensu V. Anistratenko, 1995 misapplication (probable misidentification); Rissoa lactea Michaud, 1830 (original combination); Alvania (Massotia) lactea Michaud, 1830

= Alvania lactea =

Species of gastropod

Alvania lactea is a species of small sea snail, a marine gastropod mollusk or micromollusk in the family Rissoidae.

== Description ==
The length of the shell varies between 4 mm and 8 mm.

The thin shell is subtranslucid to opaque. It is feebly longitudinally and spirally closely costellate. The color is yellowish white or white. The shell contains 5-6, subconvex whorls with linear suture. The outer lip is scarcely thickened externally.

== Distribution ==
This species occurs in the North Sea; also off Morocco and in the Black Sea; in the Mediterranean Sea off Greece.

Fossils were found in Pleistocene-Pliocene strata in the Netherlands and Pleistocene strata near Saint-Malo, France.
