= Schwartziella luisi =

Scientific classification
- Kingdom: Animalia
- Phylum: Mollusca
- Class: Gastropoda
- Subclass: Caenogastropoda
- Order: Littorinimorpha
- Family: Zebinidae
- Genus: Schwartziella
- Species: S. luisi

Binomial name
- Schwartziella luisi Rolán & Luque, 2000

Species of gastropod

Schwartziella luisi is a species of minute sea snail, a marine gastropod mollusk or micromollusk in the family Zebinidae.

== Description ==
Schwartziella luisi belongs to the family Zebinidae, a group of minute marine gastropods. The shell is small, with the height attaining 2.8 mm. The species was described by Rolán and Luque in 2000 from specimens found in the Cape Verde Archipelago in the Atlantic Ocean.

== Distribution ==
This species occurs in the Atlantic Ocean off the Cape Verdes.
