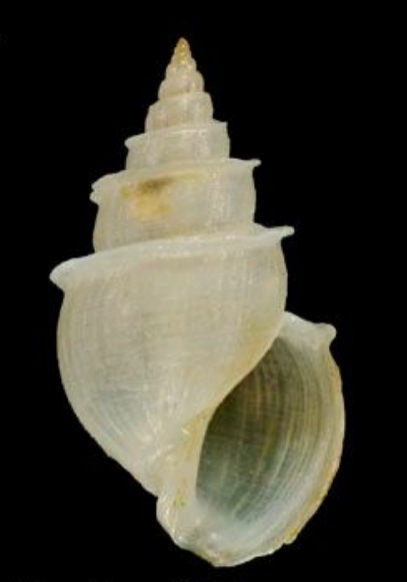
- Shell of Microstelma oshikatai (specimen at the Natural History Museum, Rotterdam)

Scientific classification
- Kingdom: Animalia
- Phylum: Mollusca
- Class: Gastropoda
- Subclass: Caenogastropoda
- Order: Littorinimorpha
- Family: Zebinidae
- Genus: Microstelma
- Species: M. oshikatai

Binomial name
- Microstelma oshikatai Lan, 2003

= Microstelma oshikatai =

Species of gastropod

Microstelma oshikatai is a species of small sea snail, a marine gastropod micromollusk in the family Zebinidae.
