= Schwartziella puncticulata =

Scientific classification
- Kingdom: Animalia
- Phylum: Mollusca
- Class: Gastropoda
- Subclass: Caenogastropoda
- Order: Littorinimorpha
- Family: Zebinidae
- Genus: Schwartziella
- Species: S. puncticulata

Binomial name
- Schwartziella puncticulata Rolán & Luque, 2000

Species of gastropod

Schwartziella puncticulata is a species of minute sea snail, a marine gastropod mollusk or micromollusk in the family Zebinidae.

== Description ==
The height of the shell attains 4.5 mm.

== Distribution ==
This species occurs in the Atlantic Ocean off the Cape Verdes.
