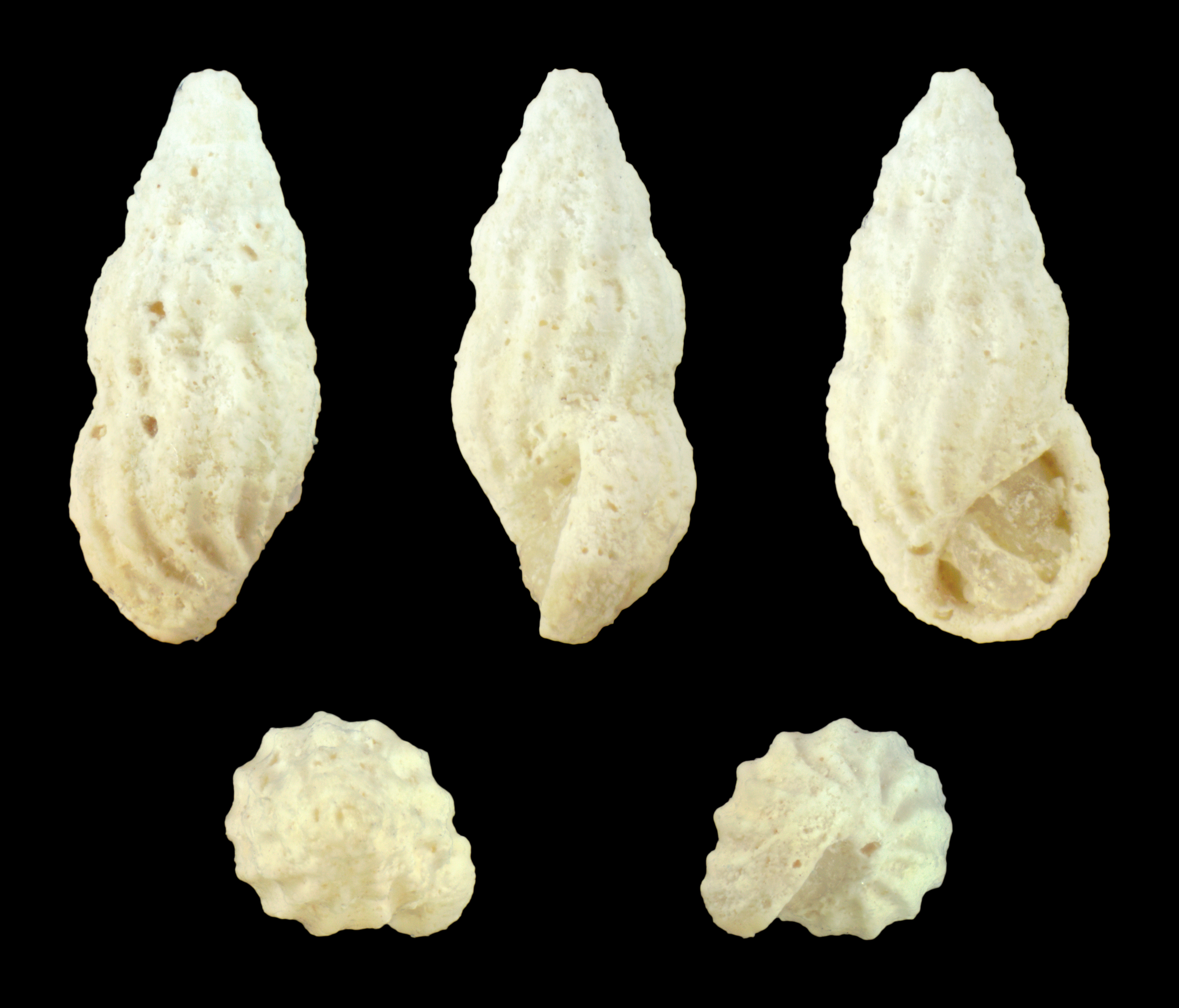
- Fossil shell from Pliocene of Florida

Scientific classification
- Kingdom: Animalia
- Phylum: Mollusca
- Class: Gastropoda
- Subclass: Caenogastropoda
- Order: Littorinimorpha
- Family: Zebinidae
- Genus: Schwartziella
- Species: S. floridana

Binomial name
- Schwartziella floridana (Olsson & Harbison, 1953)

Synonyms
- Rissoina floridana Olsson & Harbison, 1953 (original combination)

= Schwartziella floridana =

Species of gastropod

Schwartziella floridana is a species of minute sea snail, a marine gastropod mollusk or micromollusk in the family Zebinidae.

== Distribution ==
This species occurs in the Gulf of Mexico.

== Description ==
The maximum recorded shell length is 4.5 mm.

== Habitat ==
Minimum recorded depth is 0 m. Maximum recorded depth is 48 m.
