= Zebina maxima =

Scientific classification
- Kingdom: Animalia
- Phylum: Mollusca
- Class: Gastropoda
- Subclass: Caenogastropoda
- Order: Littorinimorpha
- Family: Zebinidae
- Genus: Zebina
- Species: Z. maxima

Binomial name
- Zebina maxima Bozzetti, 2007

Synonyms
- Zebina (Tomlinella) maxima Bozzetti, L., 2007

Species of gastropod

Zebina maxima is a species of minute sea snail, a marine gastropod mollusk or micromollusk in the family Zebinidae.

== Description ==
The height of the shell attains 14 mm.

== Distribution ==
This species occurs in the Indian Ocean off Madagascar.
