= S. typica =

S. typica may refer to:

- Schwartziella typica, a sea snail species
- Sepia typica, a cuttlefish species native to the southwestern Indian Ocean and southeastern Atlantic Ocean
- Similipepsis typica, a moth species known from Cameroon, Equatorial Guinea, Sierra Leone and Zimbabwe

== See also ==
- Typica (disambiguation)
