= Zebina oryza =

- Original drawing of a shell of Zebina oryza

Scientific classification
- Kingdom: Animalia
- Phylum: Mollusca
- Class: Gastropoda
- Subclass: Caenogastropoda
- Order: Littorinimorpha
- Family: Zebinidae
- Genus: Zebina
- Species: Z. oryza

Binomial name
- Zebina oryza Garrett, 1873

Species of gastropod

Zebina oryza is a species of minute sea snail, a marine gastropod mollusk or micromollusk in the family Rissoinidae.

== Description ==
The height of the small, white shell attains 2 mm. The shell has an oblong-ovate shape. It is solid, smooth, and shining. The spire is moderately elevated, and rather rapidly tapering. The apex is obtuse. The 6-7 whorls are flatly convex. The body whoprl is rather large and slightly compressed beneath. The suture is faintly impressed and broadly margined beneath. The rather large aperture is oblique and has a sub-ovate shape. The thick peristome is dilated. The columella is oblique.

== Distribution ==
This species occurs in the Red Sea and in the South Pacific off the Fiji Islands.
