= Tomlinella insignis =

Scientific classification
- Kingdom: Animalia
- Phylum: Mollusca
- Class: Gastropoda
- Subclass: Caenogastropoda
- Order: Littorinimorpha
- Family: Zebinidae
- Genus: Tomlinella
- Species: T. insignis

Binomial name
- Tomlinella insignis (Adams & Reeve, 1850)

Synonyms
- Dentrissoina thornleyana Laseron, 1956; Rissoa insignis Adams & Reeve, 1850; Rissoina turrita Garrett, 1873; Tomlinella chagosi Viader, 1938

Species of gastropod

Tomlinella insignis is a species of small sea snail, a marine gastropod mollusk or micromollusk in the family Zebinidae.

== Distribution ==
This species occurs in the Indian Ocean off the Mascarene Basin.
