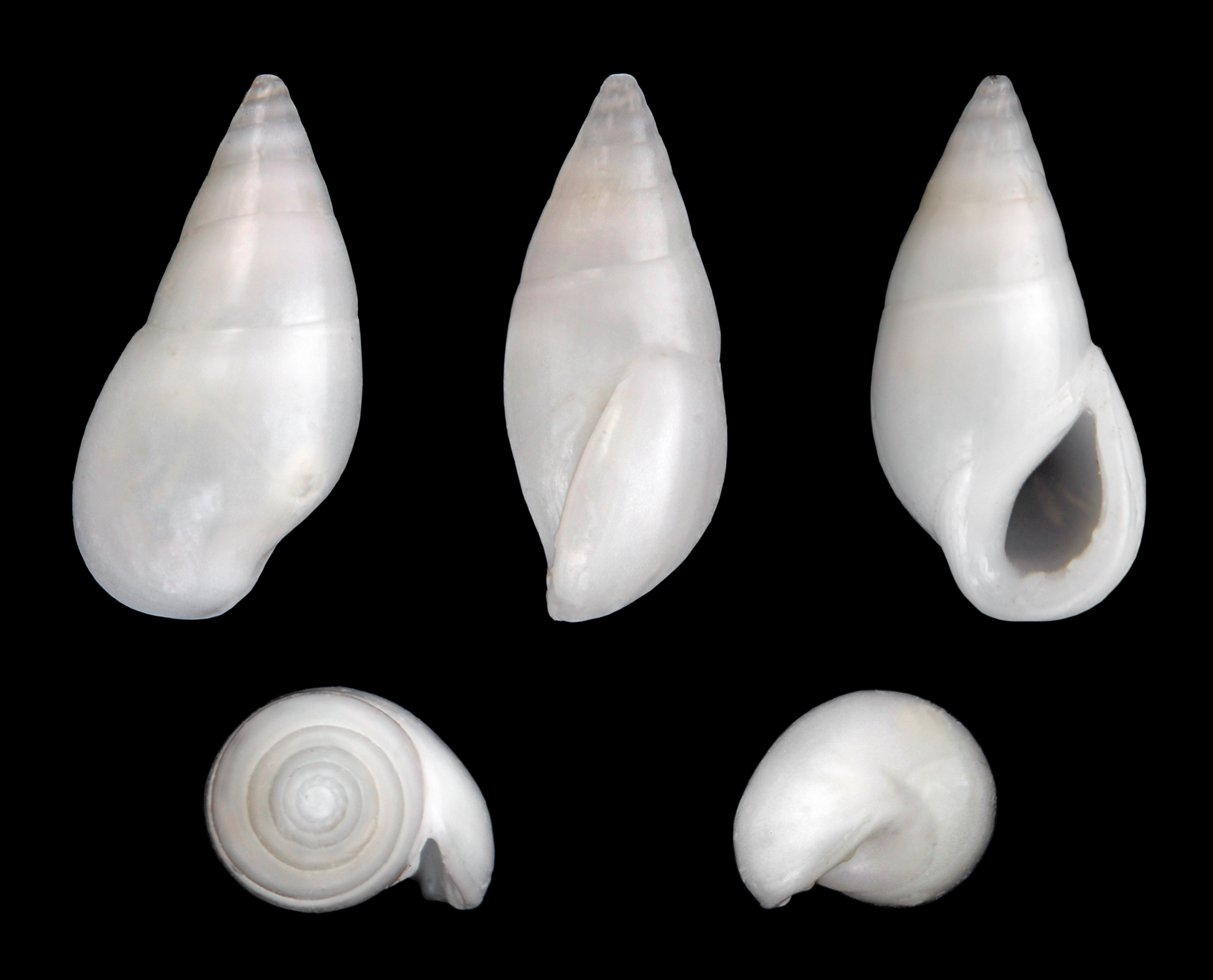

Scientific classification
- Kingdom: Animalia
- Phylum: Mollusca
- Class: Gastropoda
- Subclass: Caenogastropoda
- Order: Littorinimorpha
- Family: Zebinidae
- Genus: Zebina
- Species: Z. tridentata

Binomial name
- Zebina tridentata (Michaud, 1830)

Synonyms
- Rissoina curta "Sowerby" Schwartz von Mohrenstern, 1860 (manuscript name, published in synonymy)

= Zebina tridentata =

Species of gastropod

Zebina tridentata is a species of small sea snail, a marine gastropod mollusk or micromollusk in the family Zebinidae.

== Description ==
The size of the shell varies between 4 mm and 12 mm.

== Distribution ==
This species occurs in the Red Sea and in the Western Pacific and off the Philippines.
