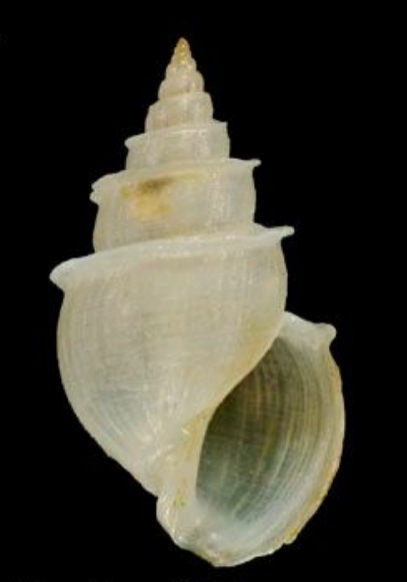
- Shell of Microstelma oshikatai

Scientific classification
- Kingdom: Animalia
- Phylum: Mollusca
- Class: Gastropoda
- Subclass: Caenogastropoda
- Order: Littorinimorpha
- Family: Zebinidae
- Genus: Microstelma; A. Adams, 1863

Type species
- Microstelma daedalum A. Adams, 1863

Synonyms
- Amaurella A. Adams, 1867; Crepitacella Guppy, 1867; Dolophanes Gabb, 1873; † Rissoina (Crepitacella) Guppy, 1867; Stylifer (Amaurella) A. Adams, 1867

= Microstelma =

Genus of gastropods

Microstelma is a genus of minute sea snails, marine gastropod mollusks or micromollusks in the family Zebinidae.

== Description ==
(Original description in Latin) The shell is turreted-ovate with a narrow slit and features a conical spire. The whorls are adorned with prominent longitudinal folds. The aperture is oblong, extended anteriorly, and subtly channeled. The inner lip is thickened and nearly straight, while the outer lip is simple.

== Species ==
Species within the genus Microstelma include:

- † Microstelma arescum (Woodring, 1928)
- † Microstelma bellardii O. Semper, 1865
- Microstelma canaliculatum (E. A. Smith, 1890)
- † Microstelma cepula (Guppy, 1866)
- Microstelma columbella (Dall, 1881)
- Microstelma daedalum A. Adams, 1863
- Microstelma gabbi (Dall, 1889)
- Microstelma glabratum (A. Adams, 1878)
- † Microstelma italicum Tabanelli, 1994
- Microstelma japonicum (A. Adams, 1867)
- † Microstelma lapernai Landau, Marquet & Grigis, 2004
- † Microstelma limonense (Olsson, 1922)
- Microstelma lutaoi Chang & Wu, 2004
- † Microstelma melanoides (Gabb, 1873)
- †Microstelma obliquecostatum (P. Marshall & Murdoch, 1920)
- Microstelma oshikatai Lan, 2003
- Microstelma semistriatum (A. Adams, 1878)
- †Microstelma sophiae Gardella & Tabanelli, 2016
- Microstelma vestale (Rehder, 1943)

Species brought into synonymy

- † Microstelma altispira (O. Haas, 1942): synonym of † Hemisinus altispira (O. Haas, 1942) (superseded combination)
- † Microstelma capula (Guppy, 1866): synonym of † Microstelma cepula (Guppy, 1866) (incorrect spelling)
- Microstelma concinna A. Adams, 1870: synonym of Microstelma concinnum A. Adams, 1870 synonym of Moerchiella dorbignyi (A. Adams, 1853) (incorrect gender ending of specific epithet)
- Microstelma concinnum A. Adams, 1870 : synonym of Moerchiella dorbignyi (A. Adams, 1853) (junior synonym)
- Microstelma daedala [sic]: synonym of Microstelma daedalum A. Adams, 1863
- Microstelma egregia (Dall, 1889): synonym of Costaclis egregia (Dall, 1889)
- Microstelma flava Okutani, 1964: synonym of Punctulum flavum (Okutani, 1964)
- Microstelma formosa Chang & Wu, 2004: synonym of Rissoina formosa (Chang & Wu, 2004)
- Microstelma glabrata [sic]: synonym of Microstelma glabratum (A. Adams, 1878)
- † Microstelma italica Tabanelli, 1994: synonym of † Microstelma italicum Tabanelli, 1994 (incorrect gender ending of specific epithet)
- Microstelma japonica (A. Adams, 1860): synonym of Microstelma japonicum (A. Adams, 1860) (incorrect gender agreement of specific epithet)
- Microstelma japonicus [sic]: synonym of Microstelma japonicum (A. Adams, 1867)
- † Microstelma limonensis [sic]: synonym of † Microstelma limonense (Olsson, 1922) (incorrect gender ending of specific epithet)
- Microstelma semistriata [sic]: synonym of Microstelma semistriatum (A. Adams, 1878)
