= Schwartziella depressa =

Scientific classification
- Kingdom: Animalia
- Phylum: Mollusca
- Class: Gastropoda
- Subclass: Caenogastropoda
- Order: Littorinimorpha
- Family: Zebinidae
- Genus: Schwartziella
- Species: S. depressa

Binomial name
- Schwartziella depressa Rolán & Luque, 2000

Species of gastropod

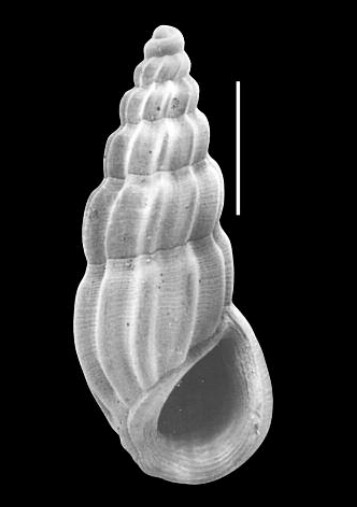
SEM micrograph of S. Depressa shell with 1mm scale bar

Schwartziella depressa is a species of minute sea snail, a marine gastropod mollusk or micromollusk in the family Zebinidae.

== Description ==
The height of the shell attains 4 mm with a maximum width of 1.6 mm.

== Distribution ==
This species occurs in the Atlantic Ocean off the Cape Verdes.
