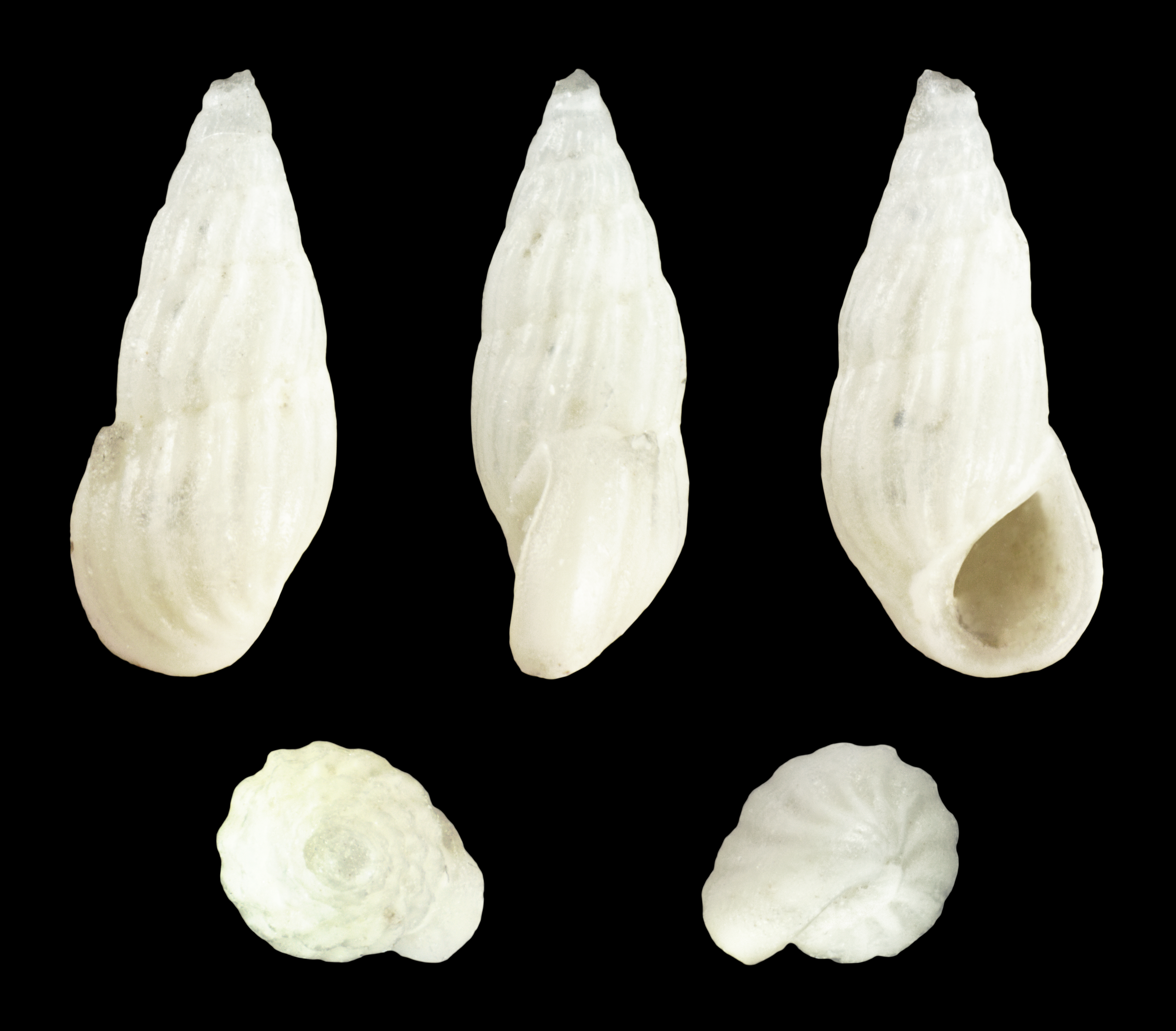
- schwartziella gibbera

Scientific classification
- Kingdom: Animalia
- Phylum: Mollusca
- Class: Gastropoda
- Subclass: Caenogastropoda
- Order: Littorinimorpha
- Family: Zebinidae
- Genus: Schwartziella
- Species: S. gibbera

Binomial name
- Schwartziella gibbera Rolán & Luque, 2000

= Schwartziella gibbera =

Species of gastropod

Schwartziella gibbera is a species of minute sea snail, a marine gastropod mollusk or micromollusk in the family Zebinidae.

== Description ==
The shell is small, robust, and elongated-conical, reaching a height of 3.7 mm and a width of 1.6 mm. It features strong, slightly curved axial ribs crossing the whorls and a smooth or weakly sculptured aperture.

== Distribution ==
This species occurs in the Atlantic Ocean off the Cape Verde, specifically recorded around the island of Sal at depths between 2 and 10 meters.
