= Zebina robustior =

Scientific classification
- Kingdom: Animalia
- Phylum: Mollusca
- Class: Gastropoda
- Subclass: Caenogastropoda
- Order: Littorinimorpha
- Family: Zebinidae
- Genus: Zebina
- Species: Z. robustior

Binomial name
- Zebina robustior Gofas, 1999

Species of gastropod

Zebina robustior is a species of small sea snail, a marine gastropod mollusk or micromollusk in the family Zebinidae.

== Description ==
The size of the shell varies between 2.5 mm and 4.2 mm.

== Distribution ==
This species occurs in the Atlantic Ocean off Western Sahara and Senegal.
