= Stosicia fernandezgarcesi =

Scientific classification
- Kingdom: Animalia
- Phylum: Mollusca
- Class: Gastropoda
- Subclass: Caenogastropoda
- Order: Littorinimorpha
- Family: Zebinidae
- Genus: Stosicia
- Species: S. fernandezgarcesi

Binomial name
- Stosicia fernandezgarcesi Espinosa & Ortea, 2002

Species of gastropod

Stosicia fernandezgarcesi is a species of small sea snail, a marine gastropod mollusk or micromollusk in the family Zebinidae.

== Description ==
The height of the shell attains 4 mm.

== Distribution ==
This species occurs in the Caribbean Sea off Cuba.
