= S. fulgida =

S. fulgida may refer to:

- Sadies fulgida, a jumping spider
- Sagra fulgida, a frog-legged beetle
- Schwartziella fulgida, a sea snail
- Seguenzia fulgida, a sea snail
- Swima fulgida, a bristle worm
