= Zebina malagazzae =

Scientific classification
- Kingdom: Animalia
- Phylum: Mollusca
- Class: Gastropoda
- Subclass: Caenogastropoda
- Order: Littorinimorpha
- Family: Zebinidae
- Genus: Zebina
- Species: Z. malagazzae

Binomial name
- Zebina malagazzae Sleurs & van Goethem, 2002

Species of gastropod

Zebina malagazzae is a species of small sea snail, a marine gastropod mollusk or micromollusk in the family Zebinidae.

== Distribution ==
This species occurs in the Pacific Ocean off the Society Islands and Tuamotu.
