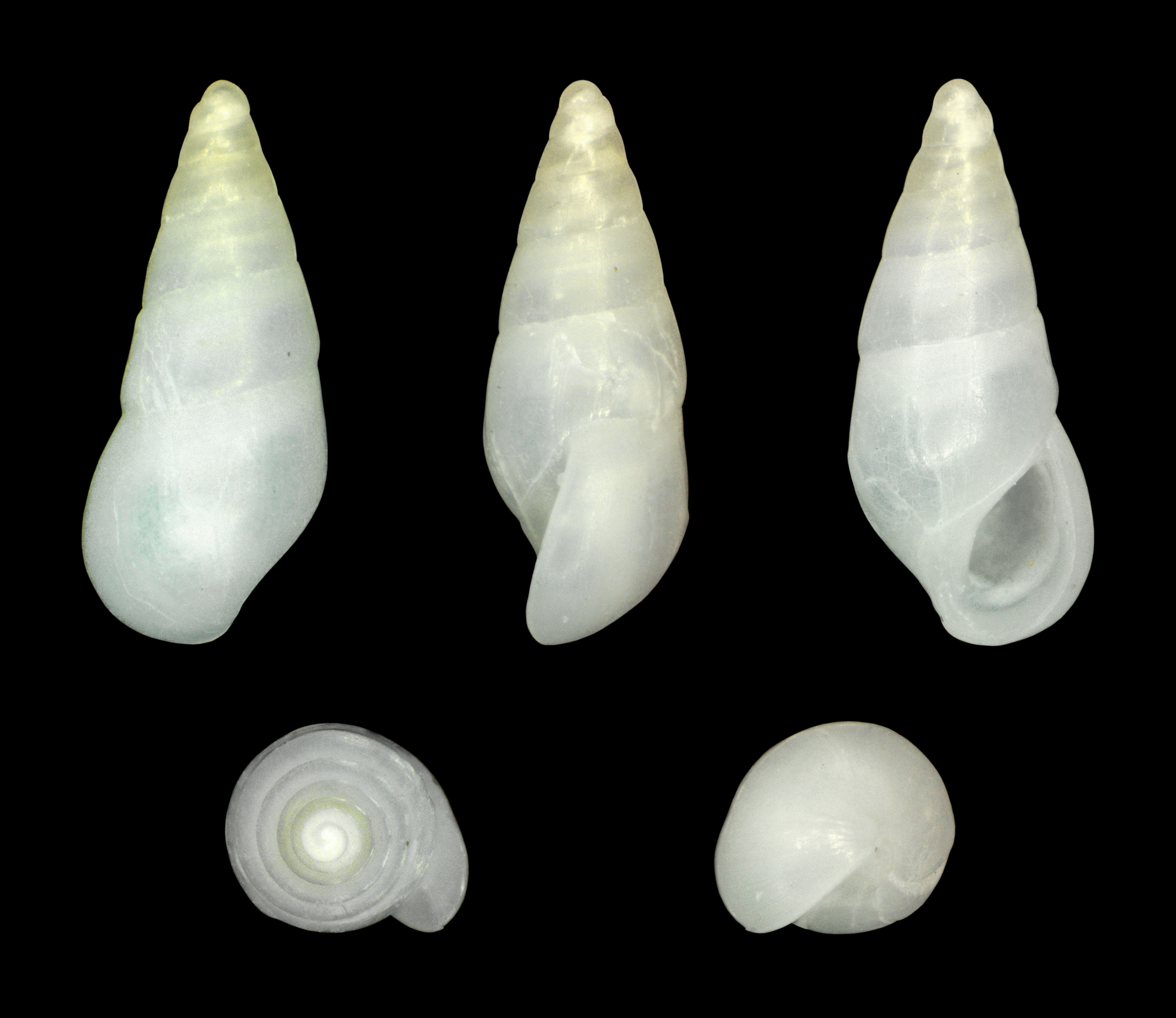

Scientific classification
- Kingdom: Animalia
- Phylum: Mollusca
- Class: Gastropoda
- Subclass: Caenogastropoda
- Order: Littorinimorpha
- Family: Zebinidae
- Genus: Zebina
- Species: Z. paivensis

Binomial name
- Zebina paivensis (Watson, 1873)

Synonyms
- Eulima paivensis Watson, 1873

= Zebina paivensis =

Species of gastropod

Zebina paivensis is a species of small sea snail, a marine gastropod mollusk or micromollusk in the family Zebinidae.

== Description ==
The size of the shell varies between 2 mm and 6.5 mm.

== Distribution ==
This species occurs in the Atlantic Ocean off the Canary Islands, Madeira and Selvagens.
