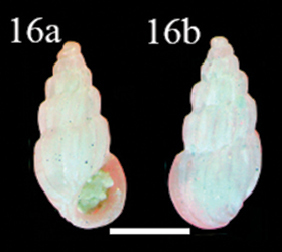

Scientific classification
- Kingdom: Animalia
- Phylum: Mollusca
- Class: Gastropoda
- Subclass: Caenogastropoda
- Order: Littorinimorpha
- Family: Zebinidae
- Genus: Schwartziella
- Species: S. fischeri

Binomial name
- Schwartziella fischeri (Desjardin, 1949)

Synonyms
- Rissoina fischeri Desjardin, 1949

= Schwartziella fischeri =

Species of gastropod

Schwartziella fischeri is a species of small sea snail, a marine gastropod mollusk or micromollusk in the family Zebinidae.

== Distribution ==
This species occurs in the Caribbean Sea, the Gulf of Mexico and the Lesser Antilles.

== Description ==
The maximum recorded shell length is 4.5 mm.

== Habitat ==
Minimum recorded depth is 0 m. Maximum recorded depth is 55 m.
