= Zebina villenai =

Scientific classification
- Kingdom: Animalia
- Phylum: Mollusca
- Class: Gastropoda
- Subclass: Caenogastropoda
- Order: Littorinimorpha
- Family: Zebinidae
- Genus: Zebina
- Species: Z. villenai

Binomial name
- Zebina villenai Rolán & Luque, 2000

Species of gastropod

Zebina villenai is a species of minute sea snail, a marine gastropod mollusk or micromollusk in the family Zebinidae.

== Description ==
The height of the shell attains 4.2 mm.

== Distribution ==
This species occurs in the Atlantic Ocean off the Cape Verde Islands.
