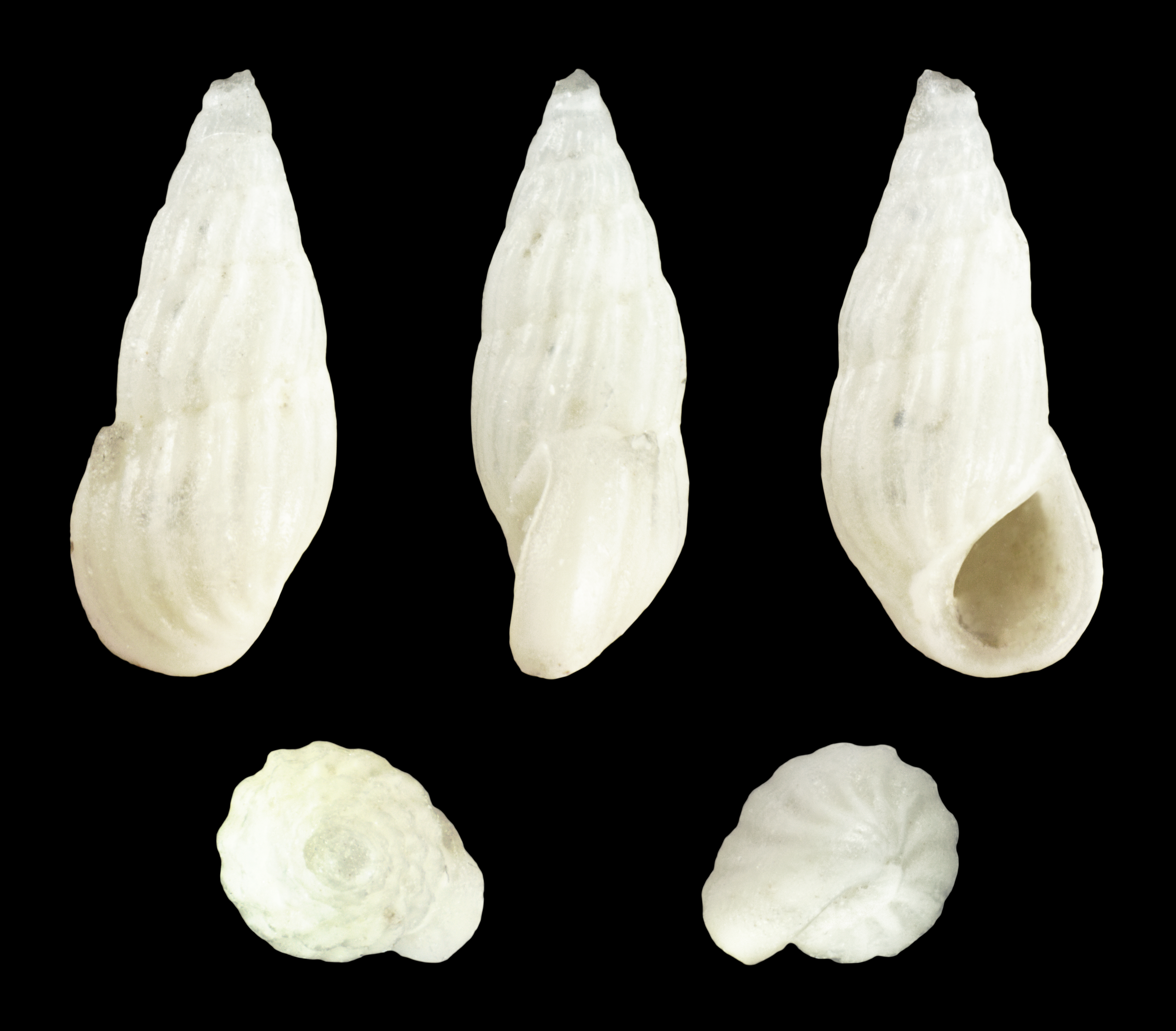

Scientific classification
- Kingdom: Animalia
- Phylum: Mollusca
- Class: Gastropoda
- Subclass: Caenogastropoda
- Order: Littorinimorpha
- Family: Zebinidae
- Genus: Schwartziella
- Species: S. bryerea

Binomial name
- Schwartziella bryerea (Montagu, 1803)

Synonyms
- Rissoa subangulata C. B. Adams, 1850; Rissoina bermudensis Peile, 1926; Rissoina bryerea (Montagu, 1803); Rissoina decipiens E. A. Smith, 1890; Rissoina michaudi Desjardin, 1949; Schwartziella subangulata (C. B. Adams, 1850); Turbo bryereus Montagu, 1803 (basionym)

= Schwartziella bryerea =

Species of gastropod

Schwartziella bryerea is a species of small sea snail, a marine gastropod mollusk or micromollusk in the family Zebinidae.

== Distribution ==
This species occurs in the Caribbean Sea, the Gulf of Mexico and the Lesser Antilles and in the Atlantic Ocean along Florida, Brazil, Ascension Island and Saint Helena.

== Description ==
The maximum recorded shell length is 5.8 mm.

== Habitat ==
Minimum recorded depth is 0 m. Maximum recorded depth is 34 m.
