= Schwartziella bouryi =

Scientific classification
- Kingdom: Animalia
- Phylum: Mollusca
- Class: Gastropoda
- Subclass: Caenogastropoda
- Order: Littorinimorpha
- Family: Zebinidae
- Genus: Schwartziella
- Species: S. bouryi

Binomial name
- Schwartziella bouryi (Desjardin, 1949)

Species of gastropod

Schwartziella bouryi is a species of minute sea snail, a marine gastropod mollusk or micromollusk in the family Zebinidae. The taxonomic validity of this species is uncertain.

== Distribution ==
This species occurs in the Caribbean Sea and the Gulf of Mexico.

== Description ==
The maximum recorded shell length is 3 mm.

== Habitat ==
Minimum recorded depth is 0 m. Maximum recorded depth is 10 m.
