= Schwartziella paradoxa =

Scientific classification
- Kingdom: Animalia
- Phylum: Mollusca
- Class: Gastropoda
- Subclass: Caenogastropoda
- Order: Littorinimorpha
- Family: Zebinidae
- Genus: Schwartziella
- Species: S. paradoxa

Binomial name
- Schwartziella paradoxa Rolán & Luque, 2000

Species of gastropod

Schwartziella paradoxa is a species of minute sea snail, a marine gastropod mollusk or micromollusk in the family Zebinidae.

== Description ==
The height of the shell reaches a length of 2.7 millimeters. Schwartziella paradoxa differs from any other species of Schwartziella found in Cape Verde by having prominent axial ribs on first whorls of its shell, which are absent on last whorl.

== Distribution ==
This species occurs in the Atlantic Ocean off the Cape Verdes.
