= Microstelma vestale =

Scientific classification
- Kingdom: Animalia
- Phylum: Mollusca
- Class: Gastropoda
- Subclass: Caenogastropoda
- Order: Littorinimorpha
- Family: Zebinidae
- Genus: Microstelma
- Species: M. vestale

Binomial name
- Microstelma vestale (Rehder, 1943)

Species of gastropod

Microstelma vestale is a species of small sea snail, a marine gastropod mollusk or micromollusk in the family Zebinidae.

== Distribution and habitat ==
It occurs in the Gulf of Mexico, with a minimum recorded depth of 33 m and a maximum recorded depth of 107 m.

== Description ==
The maximum recorded shell length is 10.8 mm.
