= Schwartziella hoenselaari =

Scientific classification
- Kingdom: Animalia
- Phylum: Mollusca
- Class: Gastropoda
- Subclass: Caenogastropoda
- Order: Littorinimorpha
- Family: Zebinidae
- Genus: Schwartziella
- Species: S. hoenselaari

Binomial name
- Schwartziella hoenselaari Rolán & Luque, 2000

Species of gastropod

Schwartziella hoenselaari is a species of small sea snail, a marine gastropod mollusk or micromollusk in the family Zebinidae.

== Description ==
The height of the shell attains 2.3 mm (0.1 in).

== Distribution ==
This species occurs in the Atlantic Ocean off the Cape Verdes.
