= Zebina semiplicata =

Scientific classification
- Kingdom: Animalia
- Phylum: Mollusca
- Class: Gastropoda
- Subclass: Caenogastropoda
- Order: Littorinimorpha
- Family: Zebinidae
- Genus: Zebina
- Species: Z. semiplicata

Binomial name
- Zebina semiplicata (Pease, 1863)

Species of gastropod

Zebina semiplicata is a species of small sea snail, a marine gastropod mollusk or micromollusk in the family Zebinidae.
