= Schwartziella yragoae =

Scientific classification
- Kingdom: Animalia
- Phylum: Mollusca
- Class: Gastropoda
- Subclass: Caenogastropoda
- Order: Littorinimorpha
- Family: Zebinidae
- Genus: Schwartziella
- Species: S. yragoae

Binomial name
- Schwartziella yragoae Rolán & Hernández, 2003

Species of gastropod

Schwartziella yragoae is a species of small sea snail, a marine gastropod mollusk or micromollusk in the family Zebinidae.

== Distribution ==
This species is found in the Atlantic Ocean off the coast of the African nation Senegal.
