= Stosicia garciai =

Scientific classification
- Kingdom: Animalia
- Phylum: Mollusca
- Class: Gastropoda
- Subclass: Caenogastropoda
- Order: Littorinimorpha
- Family: Zebinidae
- Genus: Stosicia
- Species: S. garciai

Binomial name
- Stosicia garciai Rolán, Férnández-Garcés & Lee, 2009

Species of gastropod

Stosicia garciai is a species of small sea snail, a marine gastropod mollusk or micromollusk in the family Zebinidae. It is found in the Caribbean Sea.
