= Microstelma columbella =

Scientific classification
- Kingdom: Animalia
- Phylum: Mollusca
- Class: Gastropoda
- Subclass: Caenogastropoda
- Order: Littorinimorpha
- Family: Zebinidae
- Genus: Microstelma
- Species: M. columbella

Binomial name
- Microstelma columbella (Dall, 1881)

Species of gastropod

Microstelma columbella is a species of minute sea snail, a marine gastropod mollusk or micromollusk in the family Zebinidae.

== Description ==
The maximum recorded shell length is 10 mm.

== Habitat ==
Minimum recorded depth is 289 m. Maximum recorded depth is 402 m.
