= Schwartziella minima =

Scientific classification
- Kingdom: Animalia
- Phylum: Mollusca
- Class: Gastropoda
- Subclass: Caenogastropoda
- Order: Littorinimorpha
- Family: Zebinidae
- Genus: Schwartziella
- Species: S. minima

Binomial name
- Schwartziella minima Rolán & Luque, 2000

Species of gastropod

Schwartziella minima is a species of minute sea snail, a marine gastropod mollusk or micromollusk in the family Zebinidae. The species name minima is Latin and refers to the small size of the shell.

== Description ==
The length of the shell is up to 2.8 millimetres (0.11 in), with a maximum width of 1.3 millimetres (0.051 in).

== Distribution ==
This species occurs in the Atlantic Ocean off the country of Cape Verde, specifically Boa Vista and Sal Island.
