= Schwartziella sculpturata =

Scientific classification
- Kingdom: Animalia
- Phylum: Mollusca
- Class: Gastropoda
- Subclass: Caenogastropoda
- Order: Littorinimorpha
- Family: Zebinidae
- Genus: Schwartziella
- Species: S. sculpturata

Binomial name
- Schwartziella sculpturata Rolán & Luque, 2000

Species of gastropod

Schwartziella sculpturata is a species of small sea snail, a marine gastropod mollusk or micromollusk in the family Zebinidae.

== Description ==
The height of the shell attains 2.1 mm. The parent of the species is Schwartziella G. Nevill, 1881 and they live in marine environments.

== Distribution ==
This species occurs in the Atlantic Ocean off the Cape Verdes.
