= Mirarissoina histia =

- Shell of Mirarissoina histia (holotype)

Scientific classification
- Kingdom: Animalia
- Phylum: Mollusca
- Class: Gastropoda
- Subclass: Caenogastropoda
- Order: Littorinimorpha
- Family: Zebinidae
- Genus: Mirarissoina
- Species: M. histia

Binomial name
- Mirarissoina histia (Bartsch, 1915)

Synonyms
- Folinia histia (Bartsch, 1915) (Mirarissoina accepted as full genus); Rissoina histia Bartsch, 1915 (Mirarissoina accepted as full genus)

Species of sea snail

Mirarissoina histia is a species of small sea snail, a marine gastropod mollusc in the family Zebinidae.

== Description ==
The shell is 11 mm in size.

(Original description) The shell is minute, highly polished, and milk-white. The whorls in the protoconch number a little more than one; they are smooth and well rounded. The nine postnuclear whorls are moderately rounded, appressed at the summit, and polished; they are marked only by exceedingly fine, microscopic incremental lines. The sutures are moderately impressed.

The periphery of the body whorl is well rounded and marked by a single incised line. The base is moderately long and well rounded, with a strong anterior fasciole; it is polished and marked by a single incised line situated slightly anterior to the peripheral line, which it equals in length.

The aperture is very irregular in outline and oblique, with an anterior and a posterior siphonal canal. The outer lip is claw-shaped, twisted, and sinuous; it bears a small projection in the middle of the basal line, which is reinforced immediately behind by a strong varix. The inner lip is thin and appressed to the base, with which it becomes completely fused; the continuation of the curved basal fasciole is responsible for the projection on the basal lip.

== Distribution ==
This species has been found off the west coast of America.
