= Schwartziella fulgida =

Scientific classification
- Kingdom: Animalia
- Phylum: Mollusca
- Class: Gastropoda
- Subclass: Caenogastropoda
- Order: Littorinimorpha
- Family: Zebinidae
- Genus: Schwartziella
- Species: S. fulgida

Binomial name
- Schwartziella fulgida Rolán & Luque, 2000

Species of gastropod

Schwartziella fulgida is a species of small sea snail, a marine gastropod mollusk or micromollusk in the family Zebinidae.

== Description ==
Schwartziella fulgida is a species of minute sea snail, a marine gastropod mollusk or micromollusk in the family Rissoidae. The Mollusca, common name molluscs or mollusks, is a large phylum of invertebrate animals. There are around 85,000 recognized extant species of molluscs. This is the second largest marine phylum, comprising about 17% of all the named marine organisms, behind 19% for the Crustacea. Numerous molluscs also live in freshwater and terrestrial habitats. Molluscs are highly diverse, not only in size and in anatomical structure, but also in behaviour and in habitat. https://www.morebooks.de/store/gb/book/schwartziella-fulgida/isbn/978-613-3-41941-4

The height of the shell attains 2.4 mm.

== Distribution ==
This species occurs in the Atlantic Ocean off the Cape Verdes.

The Mollusca, common name molluscs or mollusks, is a large phylum of invertebrate animals. There are about 85,000 recognized extant species of molluscs. Molluscs are highly diverse, not only in size and in anatomical structure, but also in behaviour and in habitat.
