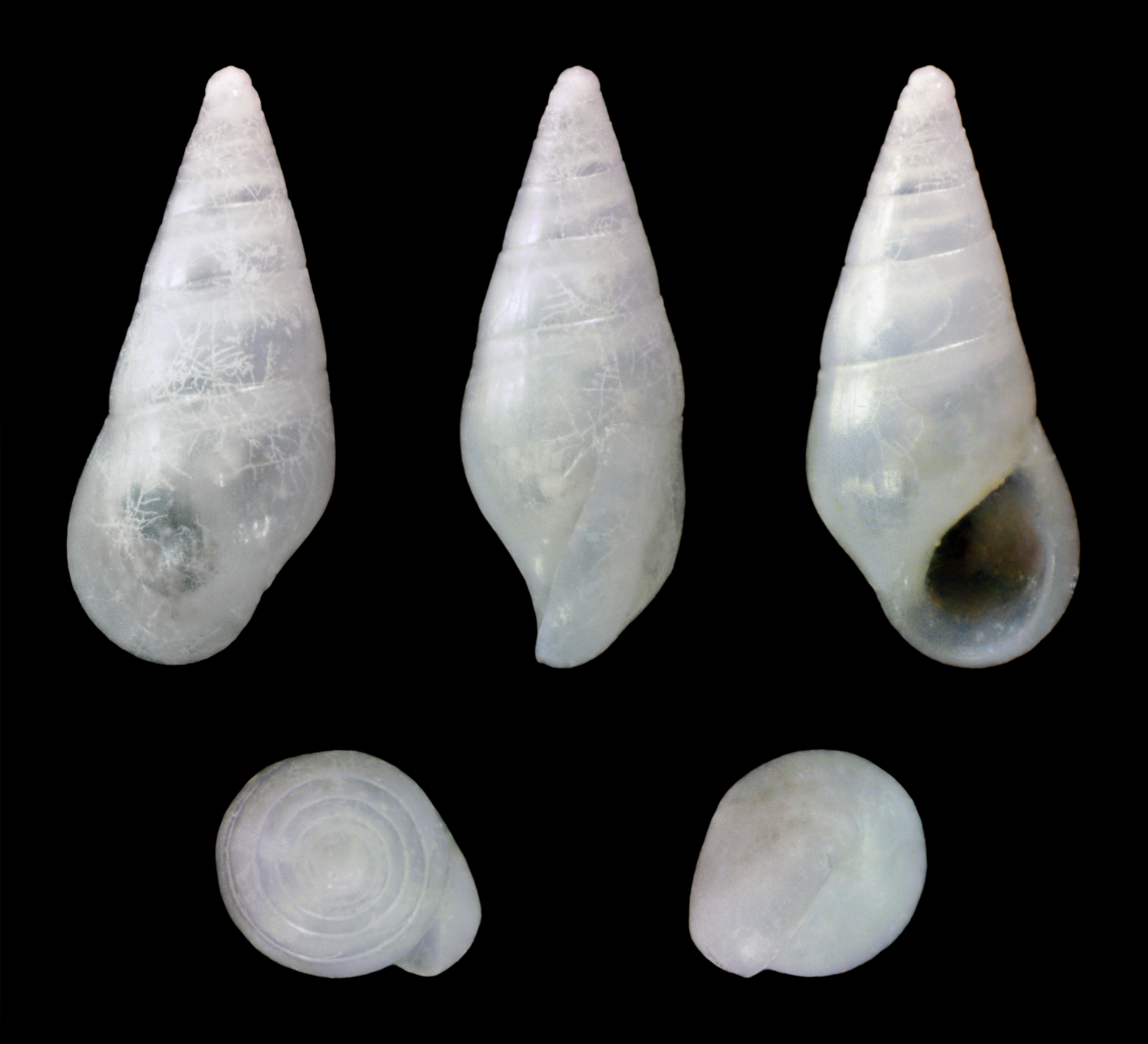
- Five views of a shell of Zebina browniana

Scientific classification
- Kingdom: Animalia
- Phylum: Mollusca
- Class: Gastropoda
- Subclass: Caenogastropoda
- Order: Littorinimorpha
- Family: Zebinidae
- Genus: Zebina
- Species: Z. browniana

Binomial name
- Zebina browniana (d'Orbigny, 1842)

Synonyms
- Rissoa browniana d'Orbigny, 1842; Rissoina browniana (d'Orbigny, 1842)

= Zebina browniana =

Species of gastropod

Zebina browniana is a species of small sea snail, a marine gastropod mollusk or micromollusk in the family Zebinidae.

== Distribution ==
This species occurs in the Caribbean Sea, the Gulf of Mexico and the Lesser Antilles; in the Atlantic Ocean off North Carolina, West Africa and the Mid-Atlantic Ridge.

== Description ==
The maximum recorded shell length is 5.1 mm.

== Habitat ==
Minimum recorded depth is 0 m. Maximum recorded depth is 51 m.
