= Costaclis mizon =

Scientific classification
- Kingdom: Animalia
- Phylum: Mollusca
- Class: Gastropoda
- Subclass: Caenogastropoda
- Order: Littorinimorpha
- Family: Eulimidae
- Genus: Costaclis
- Species: C. mizon

Binomial name
- Costaclis mizon Watson, 1881

Synonyms
- Aclis mizon Watson, 1881; Aclis muchia Locard, 1896; Costaclis joubini Dautzenberg & Fischer, 1897; Costaclis muchia Locard, 1896; Niso joucini Dautzenberg & Fischer, 1897

Species of gastropod

Costaclis mizon is a species of sea snail, a marine gastropod mollusk in the family Eulimidae.

== Description ==
(Original description) The broadly subulate shell is high, conical, umbilicated, thin, glassy and feebly ribbed longitudinally.

Sculpture. Longitudinals— on the penultimate whorl there are about 40 feeble unequal rounded riblets, which run obliquely from left to right across the whorl. They fade out on the body whorl, which, towards the aperture, presents a slightly malleated surface. On the upper whorls these riblets are fewer but more equal and distinct, but gradually fade out towards the apex. They are parted by furrows rather broader than themselves. On the base they are very feebly present. The whole surface is further covered with faint irregular hair-like lines of growth.

Spirals—there are a few very feeble, flatly-rounded, barely raised threads on the body whorl. These are rather more distinct on the base. The edge of the base is slightly and hesitatingly angulated. The lip of the umbilicus is much more distinctly and sharply so.

The colour of the shell is thin transparent white, so as to be almost glassy.

The spire is conical, long and fine. The apex is small, quite regular, and perfectly rounded, with a minute flattening down of the extreme point of the first whorl, merely sufficient to prevent its being prominent. The shell contains 15–16 whorls, of very gradual and regular increase, rounded, but the equal curve is slightly flattened for the first two-fifths of the whorl's height. The base is flatly rounded and rather produced. The suture is linear, regular and impressed.

The aperture is rather small, rhomboidal, having an acute angle above and at the point of the columella, and an obtuse angle at the corner of the base and at the top of the columella. The outer lip is very thin and sharp. It joins the body just at the circumbasal angulation, and springs at once very much forward, so as to form with the body a small, shallow, but acute-angled sinus. With a slight and regular forward curve it thus advances to the angulation of the base, from which it runs straight, flat, and slightly patulous to the point of the columella, which it joins at a bluntly-acute angle, forming a slight but not at all incised siphonal canal. The columella is not at all oblique, but is very slightly concave. The inner lip is entirely discontinuous across the body, and first makes its appearance in a small and slight porcellanous pad, which closely encircles the base of the columella. Its sharp-edged, narrow, and slightly patulous face forms the entire columella. The umbilicus lies behind the thin columellar lip and is a distinct, little, pervious, funnel-shaped pore, sharply defined by the intrabasal carination.

== Distribution ==
This species occurs in the following locations:

- European waters (ERMS scope)
- Gulf of Mexico
