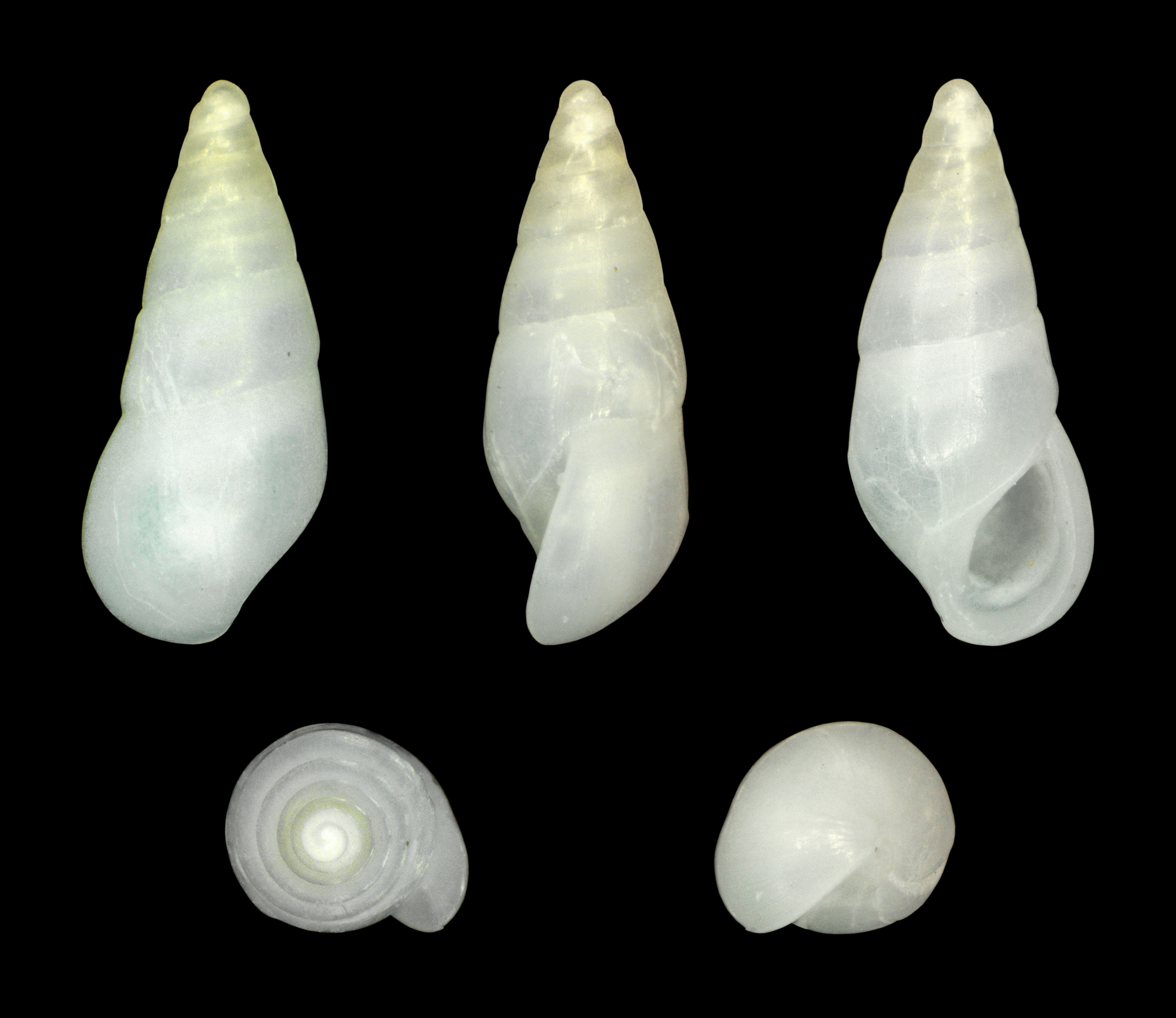
- Zebina paivensis (Watson, 1873)

Scientific classification
- Kingdom: Animalia
- Phylum: Mollusca
- Class: Gastropoda
- Subclass: Caenogastropoda
- Order: Littorinimorpha
- Family: Zebinidae
- Genus: Zebina; H. Adams & A. Adams, 1854

Type species
- Rissoina semiglabrata A. Adams, 1854

Synonyms
- Cibdezebina Woodring, 1928; Iopsis Gabb, 1873 (synonym: type species is based on a subadult Zebina species); Rissoina (Zebina) H. Adams & A. Adams, 1854 (original rank); Tiphyocerma Berry, 1958; Zebina (Tiphyocerma) Berry, 1958; Zebina (Zebina) H. Adams & A. Adams, 1854

= Zebina =

Genus of gastropods

Zebina is a genus of minute sea snails, marine gastropod mollusks or micromollusks in the family Zebinidae.

== Species ==
Species within the genus Zebina include:

- Zebina acicula Laseron, 1956
- Zebina adamsiana (Weinkauff, 1881)
- † Zebina aquitanica (Cossmann & Peyrot, 1919)
- Zebina axeliana (Hertlein & Strong, 1951)
- Zebina benthicola Habe, 1961
- † Zebina bespiso Lozouet, 2015
- Zebina bidentata (Philippi, 1845)
- Zebina browniana (d'Orbigny, 1842)
- Zebina constricta Laseron, 1956
- Zebina cooperi W. R. B. Oliver, 1915
- † Zebina dziki Kaim, 2004
- † Zebina fallax (Deshayes, 1864)
- † Zebina fusiformis (Gabb, 1873)
- Zebina gabbii (Mørch, 1876)
- Zebina hebes (Watson, 1883)
- Zebina heronensis Laseron, 1956
- † Zebina hungarica Szöts, 1953
- Zebina inflata Laseron, 1956
- Zebina isolata Laseron, 1956
- Zebina kalinagorum Faber, 2017
- † Zebina killeblebana Ladd, 1966
- † Zebina kraussi (Turton, 1932)
- † Zebina levigatissima (Deshayes, 1864)
- Zebina linearis Laseron, 1956
- Zebina malagazzae Sleurs & van Goethem, 2002
- Zebina maxima Bozzetti, 2007
- † Zebina metaltilana Ladd, 1966
- Zebina moolenbeeki Faber & Gori, 2016
- † Zebina nerina (d'Orbigny, 1852)
- † Zebina neriniformis (Boettger, 1901)
- Zebina oryza (Garrett, 1873)
- Zebina paivensis (Watson, 1873)
- Zebina preposterum (Berry, 1958)
- Zebina pupiniformis (Preston, 1908)
- Zebina reclina Sleurs, 1991
- Zebina retusa Sleurs, 1991
- Zebina robustior (Gofas, 1999)
- † Zebina sanctimartini Lozouet, 2011
- † Zebina sarcignanensis Lozouet, 2015
- † Zebina scalata (Cossmann, 1893)
- † Zebina schwartzi (Deshayes, 1861)
- Zebina semiglabrata (A. Adams, 1854)
- Zebina semiplicata (Pease, 1863)
- Zebina sloaniana (d'Orbigny, 1842)
- Zebina striaticallosa Faber, 2011
- † Zebina subneriniformis Lozouet, 1999
- Zebina tridentata (Michaud, 1830)
- Zebina unamae Rolan, 1998
- Zebina villenai Rolán & Luque, 2000
- Zebina vitrea (C. B. Adams, 1850)
- Zebina vitrinella (Mörch, 1876)
- † Zebina zitteli Szöts, 1953
- † Zebina zuschini Harzhauser, 2014

Species brought into synonymy

- Zebina cordorae De Jong & Coomans, 1988: synonym of Zebina vitrinella (Mörch, 1876)
- Zebina hebes (Watson, 1883): synonym of Eulima hebes Watson, 1883
- Zebina japonica (Weinkauff, 1881): synonym of Takirissoina japonica (Weinkauff, 1881)
- Zebina laevigata (C. B. Adams, 1850): synonym of Zebina sloaniana (d'Orbigny, 1842)
- Zebina lis Tomlin, 1918: synonym of Zebina pupiniformis (Preston, 1908)
- Zebina nitens Laseron, 1956 : synonym of Zebina oryza (Garrett, 1873) (junior secondary synonym)
- Zebina punctostriata Talavera, 1975: synonym of Rissoina punctostriata (Talavera, 1975)
- Zebina spirata Sowerby, 1825: synonym of Rissoina spirata Sowerby I, 1820
