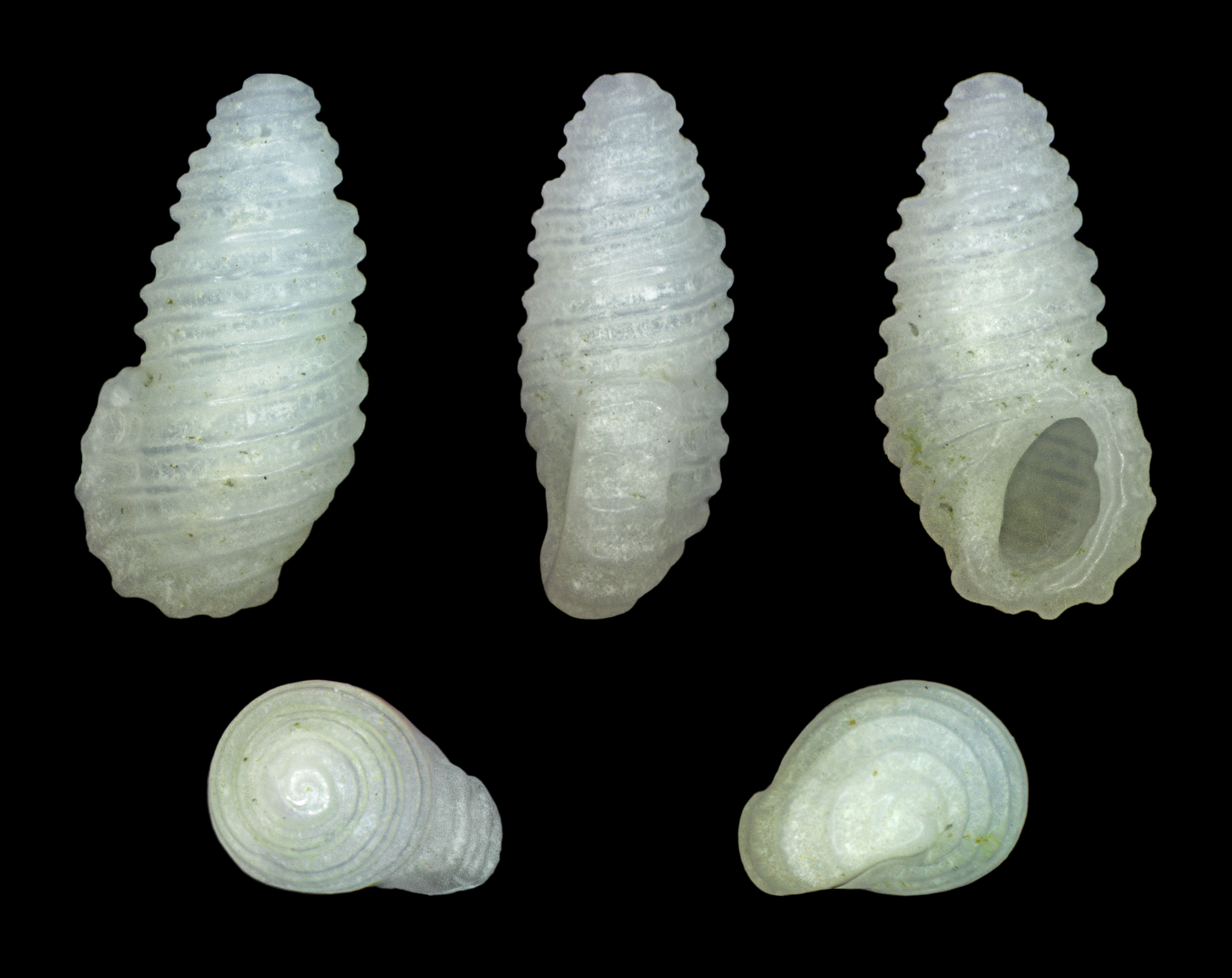
- Stosicia annulata (Dunker, 1877)

Scientific classification
- Kingdom: Animalia
- Phylum: Mollusca
- Class: Gastropoda
- Subclass: Caenogastropoda
- Order: Littorinimorpha
- Family: Zebinidae
- Subfamily: Stosiciinae
- Genus: Stosicia; Brusina, 1870

Type species
- † Stosicia buccinalis (Grateloup, 1828)

Synonyms
- Isselia Semper, 1874 (nomen nudum); Stossichia Boettger, 1887 (unjustified emendation of Stosicia)

= Stosicia =

Genus of gastropods

Stosicia is a genus of minute sea snails, marine gastropod mollusks or micromollusks in the family Zebinidae.

== Species ==
Species within the genus Stosicia include:

- Stosicia aberrans (C. B. Adams, 1850)
- Stosicia abnormis (G. Nevill & H. Nevill, 1875)
- Stosicia annulata (Dunker, 1859)
- † Stosicia bandensis (Kókay, 1966)
- Stosicia bougei (Bavay, 1917)
- Stosicia bourguignati (Issel, 1869)
- † Stosicia buccinalis (Grateloup, 1828)
- Stosicia chiltoni (Oliver, 1914)
- † Stosicia costata (Boettger, 1887)
- Stosicia fernandezgarcesi Espinosa & Ortea, 2002
- Stosicia garciai Rolán, Férnández-Garcés & Lee, 2009
- Stosicia hedleyi (Tate, 1899)
- Stosicia hiloensis (Pilsbry & Vanatta, 1908)
- Stosicia houbricki Sleurs, 1996
- Stosicia incisa (Laseron, 1956)
- Stosicia lochi Sleurs, 1996
- Stosicia manikiensis Sleurs, 1996
- Stosicia mirabilis (Weinkauff, 1881)
- † Stosicia multicingulata (Boettger, 1887)
- Stosicia paschalis (Melvill & Standen, 1901)
- † Stosicia semicostulata (Boettger, 1887)

Species brought into synonymy

- † Stosicia planaxoides (Grateloup, 1838): synonym of † Stosicia buccinalis (Grateloup, 1828)
- Stosicia polytropa (Hedley, 1899): synonym of Stosicia mirabilis (Weinkauff, 1881)
