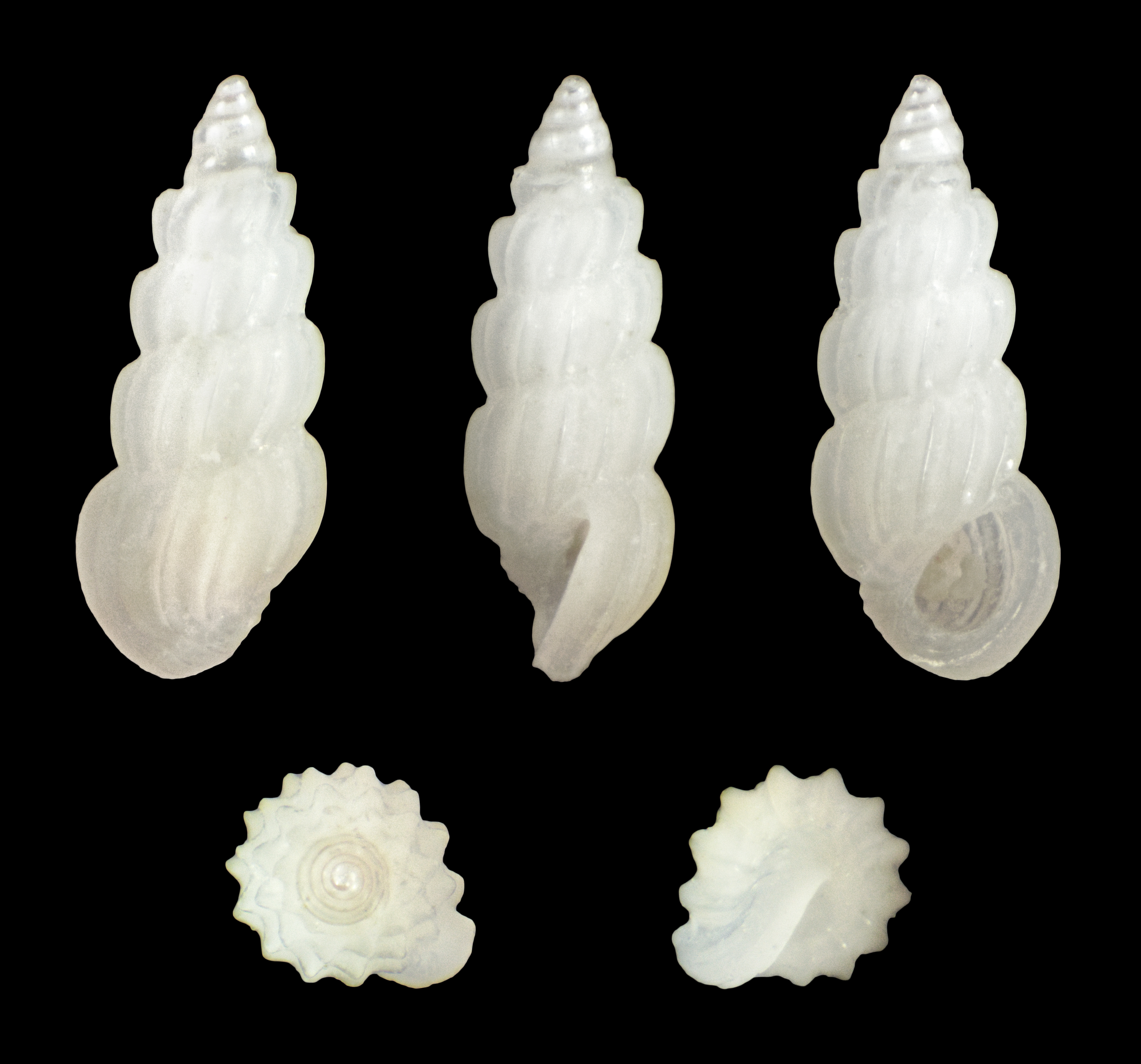
- Shell of Pandalosia ephamilla

Scientific classification
- Kingdom: Animalia
- Phylum: Mollusca
- Class: Gastropoda
- Subclass: Caenogastropoda
- Order: Littorinimorpha
- Superfamily: Rissooidea
- Family: Zebinidae
- Genus: Pandalosia; Laseron, 1956

Type species
- Pandalosia excelsis Laseron, 1956

Synonyms
- Pseudoschwartziella Bandel, 2006; Schwartziella (Pandalosia) Laseron, 1956

= Pandalosia =

Genus of gastropods

Schwartziella is a genus of minute sea snails, marine gastropod mollusks or micromollusks in the family Zebinidae.

== Species ==
- Pandalosia delicatula Laseron, 1956
- Pandalosia ephamilla (R. B. Watson, 1886)
- Pandalosia minuta (G. Nevill & H. Nevill, 1874)
- Pandalosia oceanica Laseron, 1956
- Pandalosia subfirmata (O. Boettger, 1887)
- Pandalosia subulata Laseron, 1956
- Pandalosia viticula (Laseron, 1956)

Synonyms

- Pandalosia darwinensis Laseron, 1956: synonym of Pandalosia subfirmata (O. Boettger, 1887) (junior synonym)
- Pandalosia excelsis Laseron, 1956: synonym of Pandalosia subfirmata (O. Boettger, 1887) (junior synonym)
- Pandalosia mizunamiensis Itoigawa & Nishimoto, 1984: synonym of Pandalosia ephamilla (R. B. Watson, 1886)
- Pandalosia obtusa Laseron, 1956: synonym of Pandalosia subfirmata (O. Boettger, 1887) (junior synonym)
