= Costaclis hyalina =

Scientific classification
- Kingdom: Animalia
- Phylum: Mollusca
- Class: Gastropoda
- Subclass: Caenogastropoda
- Order: Littorinimorpha
- Family: Eulimidae
- Genus: Costaclis
- Species: C. hyalina

Binomial name
- Costaclis hyalina Watson, 1881

Synonyms
- Aclis hyalina Watson, 1880; Aclis nucleata Dall, 1889; Costaclis nucleata (Dall, 1889)

Species of gastropod

Costaclis hyalina is a species of sea snail, a marine gastropod mollusk in the family Eulimidae.

== Description ==
The maximum recorded shell length is 10.7 mm.

== Habitat ==
Minimum recorded depth is 2 m. Maximum recorded depth is 848 m.
