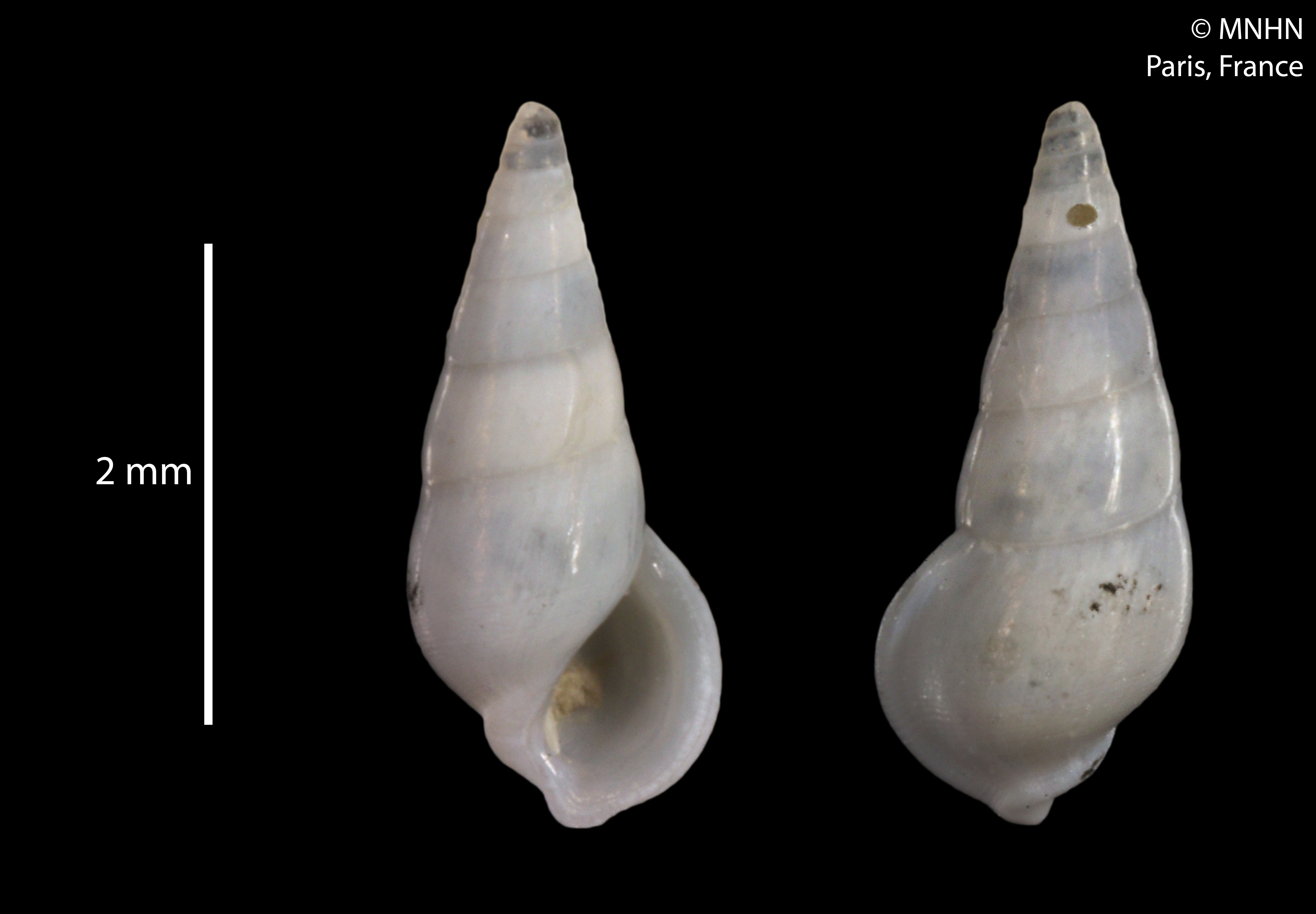
- Shell of Mirarissoina trauseli (paratype at MNHN, Paris)

Scientific classification
- Kingdom: Animalia
- Phylum: Mollusca
- Class: Gastropoda
- Subclass: Caenogastropoda
- Order: Littorinimorpha
- Superfamily: Rissooidea
- Family: Zebinidae
- Genus: Mirarissoina; Woodring, 1928

Type species
- † Rissoina lepida Woodring, 1928

= Mirarissoina =

Genus of gastropods

Mirarissoina is a genus of minute sea snails, marine gastropod mollusks or micromollusks in the family Zebinidae.

== Species ==
Species within the genus Mirarissoina include:

- Mirarissoina bermudezi (Aguayo & Rehder, 1936)
- Mirarissoina histia (Bartsch, 1915)
- † Mirarissoina juncea (J. Gardner, 1947)
- Mirarissoina lata Faber & Moolenbeek, 2013
- † Mirarissoina lepida (Woodring, 1928)
- Mirarissoina trauseli Faber & Slieker, 2014
- † Mirarissoina xesta (Woodring, 1928)
