= Lapsigyrus =

Scientific classification
- Kingdom: Animalia
- Phylum: Mollusca
- Class: Gastropoda
- Subclass: Caenogastropoda
- Order: Littorinimorpha
- Family: Zebinidae
- Genus: Lapsigyrus; Berry, 1958

Type species
- Lapsigyrus mutans Jordan, 1936

Genus of gastropods

Lapsigyrus is a genus of minute sea snails, marine gastropod mollusks or micromollusks in the family Zebinidae.

== Species ==
Species within the genus Lapsigyrus include:

- Lapsigyrus mutans (Carpenter, 1857)
- Lapsigyrus myriosirissa Shasky, 1970
