= Tomlinella =

Scientific classification
- Kingdom: Animalia
- Phylum: Mollusca
- Class: Gastropoda
- Subclass: Caenogastropoda
- Order: Littorinimorpha
- Family: Zebinidae
- Genus: Tomlinella; Viader, 1938

Type species
- Tomlinella miranda Viader, 1938

Synonyms
- Dentrissoina Laseron, 1956; Ishimoria Kuroda, 1960

Genus of gastropods

Tomlinella is a genus of minute sea snails, marine gastropod mollusks or micromollusks in the family Zebinidae.

== Species ==
Species within the genus Tomlinella include:

- Tomlinella insignis (Adams & Reeve, 1850)
- Tomlinella lamellata (Kuroda, 1960)
- Tomlinella miranda Viader, 1938
