= Costaclis =

Scientific classification
- Kingdom: Animalia
- Phylum: Mollusca
- Class: Gastropoda
- Subclass: Caenogastropoda
- Order: Littorinimorpha
- Family: Eulimidae
- Genus: Costaclis; Bartsch, 1947

Type species
- Aclis nucleata Dall, 1889

Genus of gastropods

Costaclis is a genus of medium-sized sea snails, marine gastropod mollusks in the family Eulimidae.

== Species ==
The species within this genus include the following:

- Costaclis egregia (Dall, 1889)
- Costaclis hyalina (Watson, 1881)
- Costaclis mizon (Watson, 1881)

Species brought into synonymy

- Costaclis joubini (Dautzenberg & Fischer, 1897): synonym of Costaclis mizon (Watson, 1881)
- Costaclis muchia (Locard, 1896): synonym of Costaclis mizon (Watson, 1881)
- Costaclis nucleata (Dall, 1889): synonym of Costaclis hyalina (Watson, 1881)
