= Mirarissoina bermudezi =

Scientific classification
- Kingdom: Animalia
- Phylum: Mollusca
- Class: Gastropoda
- Subclass: Caenogastropoda
- Order: Littorinimorpha
- Family: Zebinidae
- Genus: Mirarissoina
- Species: M. bermudezi

Binomial name
- Mirarissoina bermudezi (Aguayo & Rehder, 1936)

Synonyms
- Folinia bermudezi (Aguayo & Rehder, 1936); Rissoina bermudezi Aguayo & Rehder, 1936

Species of gastropod

Mirarissoina bermudezi is a species of small sea snail, a marine gastropod mollusk or micromollusk in the family Zebinidae.

== Distribution ==
This species occurs in the Caribbean Sea and the Gulf of Mexico.

== Description ==
The maximum recorded shell length is 5.2 mm.

== Habitat ==
Minimum recorded depth is 0 m. Maximum recorded depth is 73 m.
