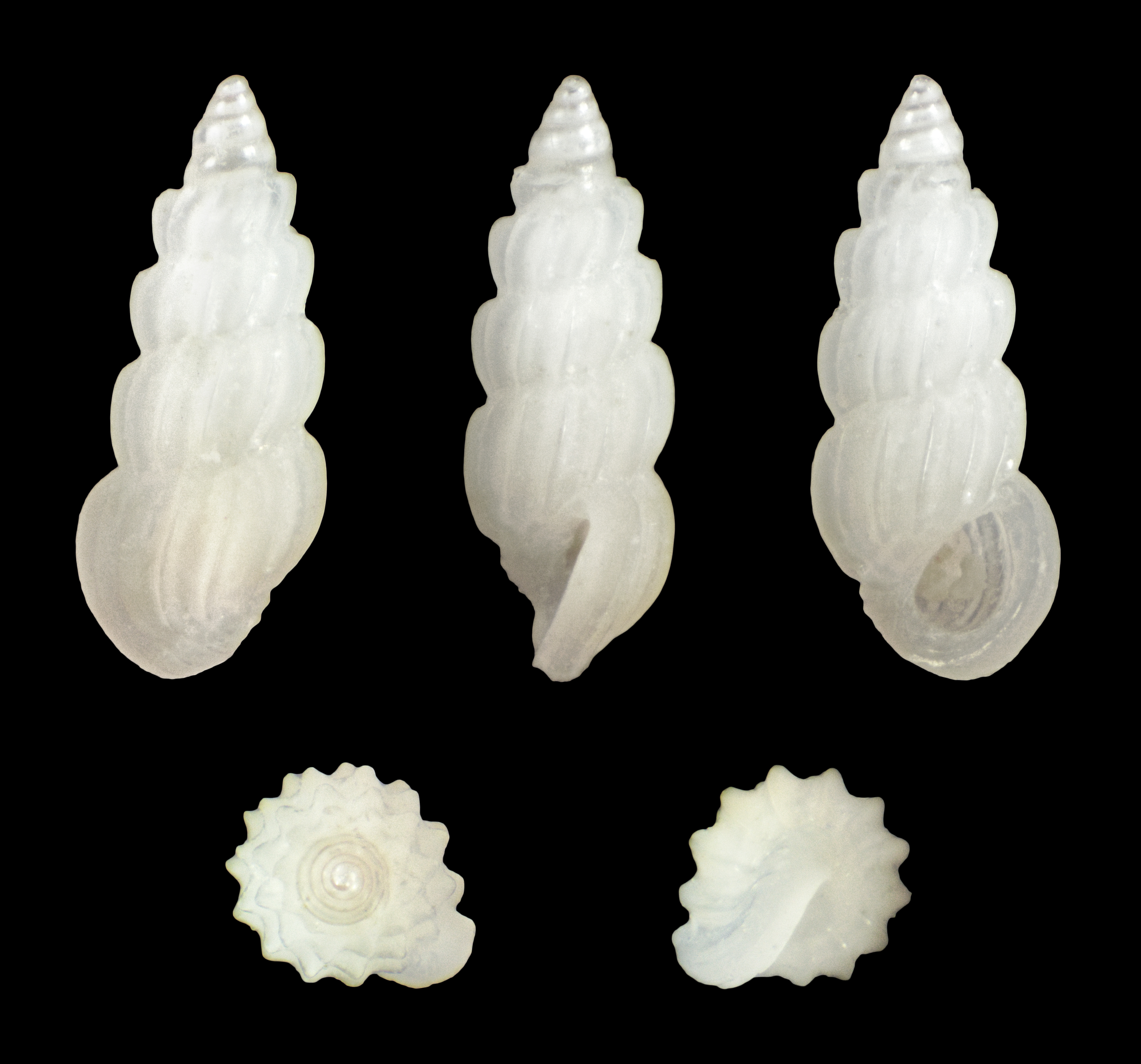

Scientific classification
- Kingdom: Animalia
- Phylum: Mollusca
- Class: Gastropoda
- Subclass: Caenogastropoda
- Order: Littorinimorpha
- Family: Zebinidae
- Genus: Pandalosia
- Species: P. ephamilla

Binomial name
- Pandalosia ephamilla (Watson, 1886)

Synonyms
- Pandalosia mizunamiensis Itoigawa & Nishimoto, 1984; Rissoina ephamella (Watson, 1886) sensu Laseron, 1956 (incorrect subsequent spelling); Rissoina ephamilla (Watson, 1886); Rissoina porteri Baker, Hanna & Strong, 1930; Rissoina scalariformis Watson, 1886 (junior homonym of R. scalariformis C. B. Adams, replaced by Watson with R. ephamilla); Schwartziella (Pandalosia) ephamilla (Watson, 1886); Schwartziella ephamilla (Watson, 1886); Schwartziella scalariformis (Watson, 1886) (primary junior homonym, replaced by the author to Schwartziella firmata (C. B. Adams, 1852))

= Pandalosia ephamilla =

Species of gastropod

Pandalosia ephamilla is a species of small sea snail, a marine gastropod mollusc or micromollusc in the family Zebinidae.

== Distribution ==
This species occurs in the Red Sea and off New Zealand.
