= Pandalosia delicatula =

Scientific classification
- Kingdom: Animalia
- Phylum: Mollusca
- Class: Gastropoda
- Subclass: Caenogastropoda
- Order: Littorinimorpha
- Family: Zebinidae
- Genus: Pandalosia
- Species: P. delicatula

Binomial name
- Pandalosia delicatula Laseron, 1956

Synonyms
- Schwartziella delicatula Laseron, 1956 (Pandalosia is regarded as a synonym of Schwartziella)

Species of gastropod

Pandalosia delicatula is a species of small sea snail, a marine gastropod mollusk or micromollusk in the family Zebinidae.

This species occurs in the Atlantic Ocean off the Cape Verdes. The type species was found off Christmas Island.
