= Costaclis egregia =

Scientific classification
- Kingdom: Animalia
- Phylum: Mollusca
- Class: Gastropoda
- Subclass: Caenogastropoda
- Order: Littorinimorpha
- Family: Eulimidae
- Genus: Costaclis
- Species: C. egregia

Binomial name
- Costaclis egregia Dall, 1889

Synonyms
- Microstelma egregia Dall, 1889

Species of gastropod

Costaclis egregia is a species of sea snail, a marine gastropod mollusc in the family Eulimidae.

== Description ==
The maximum recorded shell length is 13 mm.

== Habitat ==
Minimum recorded depth is 250 m. Maximum recorded depth is 1436 m.
