= Gaspard Michaud =

French malacologist

Louis André Gaspard Michaud (7 December 1795 in Sornac – 4 April 1880 in Lyons) was a French malacologist. He is also known as Gaspard Michaud or as André Louis Gaspard Michaud.

== Biography ==
Michaud was the son of a teacher who stimulated his son's passion for natural sciences. He signed up for the infantry in 1813. He was injured twice during the siege of Metz (1814–1815). After his recovery in 1815 he became fully interested in natural sciences and began a conchological collection. When his father died in 1817, he decided to stay in the army to support his family. His career went well and he became an officer in 1823.

He started to publish his first scientific paper between 1828 and 1831, dealing mainly with Mediterranean molluscs. In 1831 he published his major work, the Complément to the works of Draparnaud (1805). In 1833 he wrote a first paper on the terrestrial molluscs of Algeria. From 1837 on he became interested in fossils, and started to publish several papers dealing with palaemalacology. Together with Valéry Louis Victor Potiez (1806–1870) he published in 1835 the Galerie des mollusques, a catalogue of the molluscs in the collection of the museum of Douai.

In 1839 he became a Chevalier de la Légion d'honneur, mainly because of his scientific contributions rather than because of his military service.

He left the army in 1844, and started work as a professor and director of the Michaud Institute in Lyons. From then on he applied himself completely to the study of molluscan fossils. He published several papers (1855, 1862, 1876, 1877) uncovering the Miocene fauna of the basin of Hauterives (Drôme).

Part of his malacological collection is still preserved at the museum of Lyons. The rest of his collection, which was donated to museums in Brive and Mâcon has largely been lost.

== Taxa described ==
Michaud named 23 genera and 225 species, among which are:

- Aporrhais serresianus (Michaud, 1828)
- Argna biplicata (Michaud, 1831)
- Pleurodiscus balmei (Potiez & Michaud, 1838)
- Leptinaria lamellata (Potiez & Michaud, 1838)
- Zebina (Zebina) tridentata (Michaud, 1830) - originally described as Rissoa tridentata Michaud, 1830

== Publications ==
- MICHAUD G., 1831a – Description de plusieurs espèces de Coquilles du genre Rissoa (Fréminville). Lyon, impr. Perrin, 16 p., 1 pl.
- MICHAUD G., 1831b – Complément de l’Histoire naturelle des mollusques terrestres et fluviatiles de la France, de J. P. R. Draparnaud. Paris, Strasbourg, Lyon et Verdun-Meuse, Lippmann, I-XVI, 116 p., 3 pl. (XIV-XVI)
- MICHAUD G., 1833 – Catalogue des Testacés vivans, terrestres et fluviatiles envoyés d’Alger par M. Rozet, au cabinet d’Histoire naturelle de Strasbourg. Notice présentée à la société d’Histoire naturelle de la même ville. Mémoires de la Société d’Histoire naturelle de Strasbourg, 1 [1830-1833], 22 p., 1 pl.
- MICHAUD G., 1855 – Description des Coquilles fossiles découvertes dans les environs d’Hauterives (Drôme). Annales de la Société linnéenne de Lyon, 2e série : 33-64, 2 pl.
- MICHAUD G., 1862 – Description des Coquilles fossiles découvertes des environs d’Hauterives (Drôme). Journal de Conchyliologie, 3e série, 2 (10) : 58-84, 2 pl.
- MICHAUD G., 1876 – Description des Coquilles fossiles découvertes dans les environs d’Hauterives (Drôme). Lyon [1866], 28 p.,
- MICHAUD G., 1877 – Description des Coquilles fossiles découvertes dans les environs d’Hauterives (Drôme), 3e fascicule. Lyon-Paris [1866], 28 p., 3 pl.
