= Zebinidae =

Scientific classification
- Kingdom: Animalia
- Phylum: Mollusca
- Class: Gastropoda
- Subclass: Caenogastropoda
- Order: Littorinimorpha
- Superfamily: Rissooidea
- Family: Zebinidae; Coan, 1964

Synonyms
- Phosinellinae Coan, 1964; Rissoininae Stimpson, 1865

Family of gastropods

Zebinidae is a family of small sea snails in the order Littorinimorpha.

== Genera ==
Genera within the family Zebinidae include:

- Cossmannia Newton, 1891†
- Folinia Crosse, 1868
- Lapsigyrus Berry, 1958
- Microstelma A. Adams, 1863
- Mirarissoina Woodring, 1928
- Pandalosia Laseron, 1956
- Pseudotaphrus Cossmann, 1888†
- Schwartziella G. Nevill, 1885
- Takirissoina Oyama, 1962
- Tomlinella Viader, 1938
- Zebina H. Adams & A. Adams, 1854
- Subfamily Stosiciinae Faber & Gori, 2016
  - Bittinella Dall, 1924
  - Isseliella Weinkauff, 1881
  - Stosicia Brusina, 1871
