= Zebinella sigmifer =

Scientific classification
- Kingdom: Animalia
- Phylum: Mollusca
- Class: Gastropoda
- Subclass: Caenogastropoda
- Order: Littorinimorpha
- Superfamily: Rissooidea
- Family: Rissoinidae
- Genus: Zebinella
- Species: Z. sigmifer

Binomial name
- Zebinella sigmifer (Mörch, 1876)

Synonyms
- Rissoina sigmifer Mörch, 1876; Rissoina (Zebinella) sigmifer Mörch, 1876 (original combination)

Species of gastropod

Zebinella sigmifer is a species of small sea snail, a marine gastropod mollusk or micromollusk in the family Rissoinidae. Its original name was Rissoina sigmifer Mörch.

== Description ==
The length of the shell attains 11 mm, its diameter is 4.75 mm.

(Original description in Latin) The shell has the same general form as Zebinella albida, but is solid and whitish. The whorls are convex. The axial ribs are strong, continuous, and obliquely, slightly arched, numbering about 25 on the body whorl, and becoming narrower toward the columella; everywhere they are crossed by very close‑set, fine spiral lirae. The suture is narrow and is bordered by a distinct marginal line. The aperture is effuse anteriorly, and the middle portion of the outer lip is slightly angulate, bearing externally three closely spaced riblets.

== Distribution ==
This marine species occurs off The Bahamas.
