= Zebinella planata =

Scientific classification
- Kingdom: Animalia
- Phylum: Mollusca
- Class: Gastropoda
- Subclass: Caenogastropoda
- Order: Littorinimorpha
- Superfamily: Rissooidea
- Family: Rissoinidae
- Genus: Zebinella
- Species: †Z. planata

Binomial name
- †Zebinella planata (Dall, 1892)

Synonyms
- † Rissoina decussata var. planata Dall, 1892

Species of gastropod

Zebinella planata is an extinct species of minute sea snail, a marine gastropod mollusk or micromollusk in the family Rissoinidae.

== Description ==
The length of the shell attains 8.3 mm, its diameter 3 mm.

(Original description) The species differs slightly from Zebinella decussata (Montagu, 1803), being proportionately wider, with the whorls flatter, the sculpture less sharply defined and tending to become obsolete. The shell is also somewhat larger.

== Distribution ==
Fossils of this species were found in Tertiary strata in Florida, USA.
