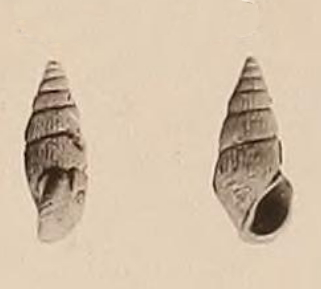
- Shell of Zebinella recticostulata (holotype)

Scientific classification
- Kingdom: Animalia
- Phylum: Mollusca
- Class: Gastropoda
- Subclass: Caenogastropoda
- Order: Littorinimorpha
- Superfamily: Rissooidea
- Family: Rissoinidae
- Genus: Zebinella
- Species: Z. recticostulata

Binomial name
- Zebinella recticostulata (Cossmann & Peyrot, 1919)

Synonyms
- † Rissoina (Zebinella) recticostulata Cossmann & Peyrot, 1919; † Rissoina recticostulata Cossmann & Peyrot, 1919

= Zebinella recticostulata =

Species of gastropod

Zebinella recticostulata is an extinct species of minute sea snail, a marine gastropod mollusk or micromollusk in the family Rissoinidae.

== Description ==
The length of the shell attains 6 mm, its diameter is 2.25 mm.

== Distribution ==
Fossils of this species were found in Neogene strata in Pyrénées-Atlantiques, France.
