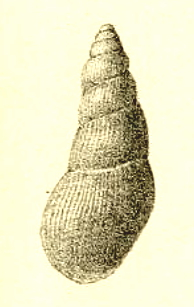
- Shell of Zebinella paumotuensis (holotype)

Scientific classification
- Kingdom: Animalia
- Phylum: Mollusca
- Class: Gastropoda
- Subclass: Caenogastropoda
- Order: Littorinimorpha
- Superfamily: Rissooidea
- Family: Rissoinidae
- Genus: Zebinella
- Species: Z. paumotuensis

Binomial name
- Zebinella paumotuensis (Couturier, 1907)

Synonyms
- Rissoina zeltneri var. paumotuensis Couturier, 1907 ·

= Zebinella paumotuensis =

Species of gastropod

Zebinella paumotuensis is a species of minute sea snail, a marine gastropod mollusk or micromollusk in the family Rissoinidae.

== Description ==
The length of the shell attains 5 mm, its diameter 1½ mm.

(Original description in French) The solid shell is quite thick. It is white and shiny. It bears numerous thin, oblique longitudinal ribs on the whorls. They fade towards the base of the body whorl, where they are replaced by spiral striae.

== Distribution ==
This marine species occurs off Tahiti.
