= Zebinella striatocostata =

Scientific classification
- Kingdom: Animalia
- Phylum: Mollusca
- Class: Gastropoda
- Subclass: Caenogastropoda
- Order: Littorinimorpha
- Family: Rissoinidae
- Genus: Zebinella
- Species: Z. striatocostata

Binomial name
- Zebinella striatocostata (d’Orbigny, 1842)

Synonyms
- Rissoa striatocostata d'Orbigny, 1842; Rissoa affinis C. B. Adams, 1845; Rissoina striatocostata (d’Orbigny, 1842); Zebinella affinis (C. B. Adams, 1845) (junior synonym)

Species of gastropod

Zebinella striatocostata is a species of small sea snail, a marine gastropod mollusk or micromollusk in the family Rissoinidae.

== Description ==
The size of the shell varies between 4 mm and 6 mm.

== Distribution ==
This species occurs in the Caribbean Sea (Guadeloupe) and the Gulf of Mexico; in the Atlantic Ocean off Brazil.
