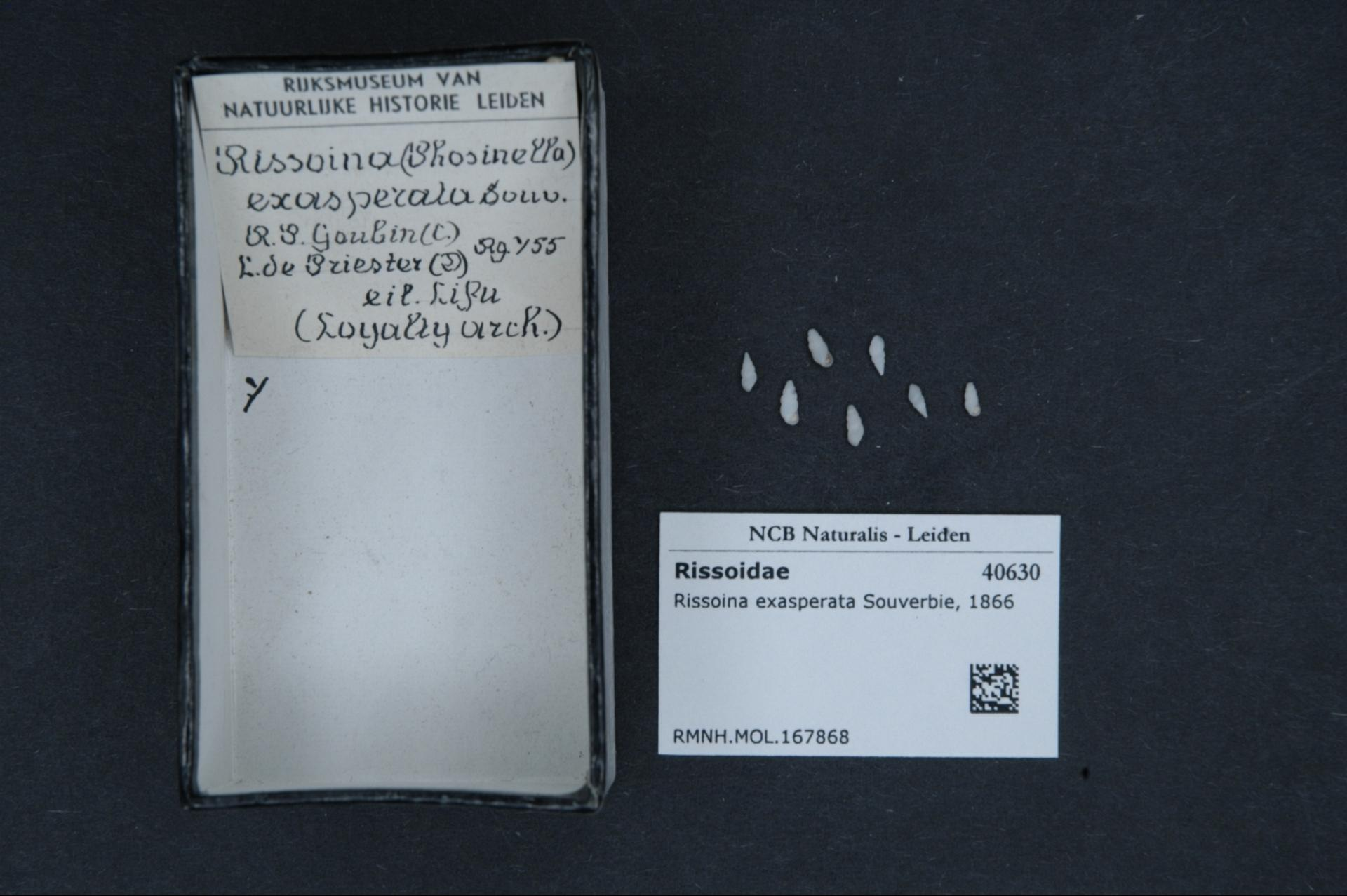

Scientific classification
- Kingdom: Animalia
- Phylum: Mollusca
- Class: Gastropoda
- Subclass: Caenogastropoda
- Order: Littorinimorpha
- Family: Rissoinidae
- Genus: Phosinella
- Species: P. exasperata

Binomial name
- Phosinella exasperata (Souverbie, 1866)

Synonyms
- Rissoina exasperata Souverbie, 1866 · (Phosinella accepted as full genus)

= Phosinella exasperata =

Species of sea snail

Phosinella exasperata is a species of small sea snail, a marine gastropod mollusc or micromollusc in the family Rissoinidae.

== Description ==
The shell reaches up to 4 mm in length.

(Original description in French) The shell is fusiform, with an acuminate spire that is slightly compressed at the base. It is ornamented with rather numerous, somewhat blunt longitudinal ribs and with small, raised transverse cords that cross them spirally. These cords become more or less nodular at the points where they intersect the ribs, depending on the individual, so that they create a very elegant cancellate sculpture over the whole shell.

These cords are generally evenly spaced, but on the body whorl they leave, at about the upper fifth of the left side of the aperture, a slightly wider interval forming a spiral groove. Below this groove, the remaining cords are much more closely set and, in a sense, take the place in that area of the terminal swelling seen in some species of the genus. The eight to nine whorls are rounded and are separated by a deeply impressed suture.

The aperture is oblique and semi‑oval, angular above and canaliculate below. The outer lip is sharp, crenulated by the terminations of the transverse cords, and appears varicose externally owing to the crowding of the last ribs of the whorl. The inner (left) lip is applied against the shell.

== Distribution ==
This species has been observed in Tahiti.
