= Zebinella sturanii =

Scientific classification
- Kingdom: Animalia
- Phylum: Mollusca
- Class: Gastropoda
- Subclass: Caenogastropoda
- Order: Littorinimorpha
- Superfamily: Rissooidea
- Family: Rissoinidae
- Genus: Zebinella
- Species: †Z. sturanii

Binomial name
- †Zebinella sturanii (Zunino & Pavia, 2009)

Synonyms
- † Rissoina sturanii Zunino & Pavia, 2009

Species of gastropod

Zebinella sturanii is an extinct species of minute sea snail, a marine gastropod mollusk or micromollusk in the family Rissoinidae.

== Distribution ==
Fossils of this species were found in Lower Miocene strata at Turin, Italy
