= Zebinella minuta =

Scientific classification
- Kingdom: Animalia
- Phylum: Mollusca
- Class: Gastropoda
- Subclass: Caenogastropoda
- Order: Littorinimorpha
- Superfamily: Rissooidea
- Family: Rissoinidae
- Genus: Zebinella
- Species: †Z. minuta

Binomial name
- †Zebinella minuta (Lozouet, 2011)

Synonyms
- † Cerithidea minuta Gabb, 1873 superseded combination; † Rissoina minuta (Gabb, 1873)

Species of gastropod

Zebinella minuta is an extinct species of minute sea snail, a marine gastropod mollusk or micromollusk in the family Rissoinidae.

== Description ==
(Original description) The minute shell is stout. The spire is about twice as long as the aperture. The shell contains seven or eight whorls. These are very slightly convex on the sides. The suture is linear. The surface is marked by numerous fine longitudinal ribs covering the spire and extending to the middle of the body whorl. These are crossed by finer revolving lines, most marked in advance. The siphonal canal is nearly obsolete and is not emarginate. The inner lip is encrusted. The outer lip is thickened and produced in advance. The aperture is acute behind.

== Distribution ==
Fossils of this species were found in Santo Domingo, Dominican Republic.
