= Zebinella dilatata =

Scientific classification
- Kingdom: Animalia
- Phylum: Mollusca
- Class: Gastropoda
- Subclass: Caenogastropoda
- Order: Littorinimorpha
- Superfamily: Rissooidea
- Family: Rissoinidae
- Genus: Zebinella
- Species: Z. dilatata

Binomial name
- Zebinella dilatata (Faber, 2017)

Synonyms
- Rissoina dilatata Faber, 2017 (Basionym); Rissoina expansa P. P. Carpenter, 1865

Species of gastropod

Zebinella dilatata is a species of minute sea snail, a marine gastropod mollusk or micromollusk in the family Rissoinidae.
