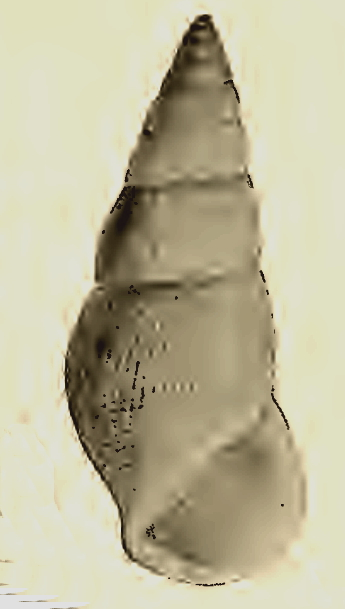
- Shell of Zebinella zeltneri

Scientific classification
- Kingdom: Animalia
- Phylum: Mollusca
- Class: Gastropoda
- Subclass: Caenogastropoda
- Order: Littorinimorpha
- Superfamily: Rissooidea
- Family: Rissoinidae
- Genus: Zebinella
- Species: Z. zeltneri

Binomial name
- Zebinella zeltneri (de Folin, 1867)

Synonyms
- Rissoa zeltneri de Folin, 1867 (basionym); Rissoina zeltneri (de Folin, 1867)

= Zebinella zeltneri =

Species of gastropod

Zebinella zeltneri is a species of small sea snail, a marine gastropod mollusk or micromollusk in the family Rissoinidae.

== Description ==
The length of the shell attains 3.8 - 4.5 mm; its diameter 1.8 mm.

(Described as Rissoina zeltneri) The elongate-conic shell is white and shining. The whorls in the protoconch are smooth, well rounded and form a helicoid spire. The postnuclear whorls are marked by feebly developed, decidedly protractive, closely spaced, rounded axial ribs, about 26 on the sixth, 28 on the seventh, 30 on the eighth, and 42 on the penultimate turn. The intercostal spaces are very feebly impressed, smooth. The suture is well marked. The base of the shell is moderately long, slightly concaved anteriorly, crossed by the continuations of the axial ribs which extend to the umbilical chink and about 14 equal and equally spaced, spiral lirations which pass over the intercostal spaces and ribs. The aperture is rather large, channeled anteriorly and posteriorly. The outer lip is effuse, reinforced immediately behind the edge by a strong varix. The inner lip is sinuous, thick and appressed to the base.

== Distribution ==
This marine species occurs off Fiji.
