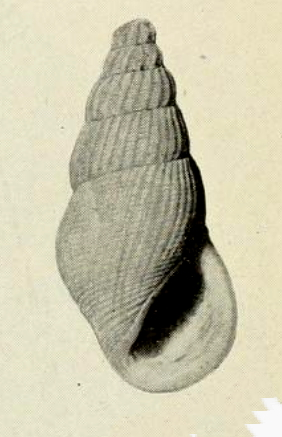
- Shell of Zebinella allemani (holotype at the Smithsonian Institution)

Scientific classification
- Kingdom: Animalia
- Phylum: Mollusca
- Class: Gastropoda
- Subclass: Caenogastropoda
- Order: Littorinimorpha
- Superfamily: Rissooidea
- Family: Rissoinidae
- Genus: Zebinella
- Species: Z. allemani

Binomial name
- Zebinella allemani (Bartsch, 1931)

Synonyms
- Rissoina allemani Bartsch, 1931 (Zebinella raised to genus)

= Zebinella allemani =

Species of gastropod

Zebinella allemani is a species of small sea snail, a marine gastropod mollusk or micromollusk in the family Rissoinidae.

== Description ==
The length of the shell attains 7.4 mm, its diameter 3.2 mm.

(Original description) The shell is rather large. The early whorls are decollated in the type. The first of the remaining postnuclear whorls is angulated halfway between the summit and suture. This angulation is less conspicuous on the next whorl and disappears entirely on the following and succeeding whorls, which are quite well rounded. The first and second whorls are appressed at the summit, while the succeeding whorls are feebly shouldered, the shoulder there being rendered crenulated by the ribs. On the first and second of the remaining whorls strong, distantly spaced, decidedly retractively slanting axial ribs are present. On the following turns these ribs become sigmoid, a little less strongly developed, and much more closely approximated.

The intercostal spaces on the first and second whorls are broad, and are marked by two spiral cords a little stronger than the rest at the angulation. The shoulder between this angulation and the summit on the first and second whorl is crossed by about 10 slender spiral threads, while the space between the suture and the strong thread anterior to it at the angulation is marked by 5 spiral threads, which are considerably stronger than those on the summit. On the three remaining whorls the stronger threads corresponding to the angulation in the middle of the turn become reduced, and only equal those anterior to it in strength.

There are 10 of these subequal threads present, while the 10 slender threads on the posterior portion of the whorl remain feeble. On the next postnuclear whorl this differentiation of spiral sculpture almost disappears, and we find 14 equal and almost equally spaced, rather strong spiral threads and a few feeble incised lines near the summit present between the summit and suture. On the body whorl 16 subequal and subequally spaced spiral threads are present between periphery and summit. Here the deeply impressed pits between the ribs and the spiral threads show finely incised spiral lines. The base of the shell is slightly produced, marked by a continuation of the axial ribs, which become evanescent on the anterior portion of the base, and by 13 strong spiral threads, of which those on the posterior portion of the short columella are a little heavier than those posterior to it. Anterior to these strong threads there is a series of six spiral threads that are much finer and much more closely approximated than those posterior to it. These are closely crowded at the extreme anterior tip of the columella.

The aperture is rather large and is auriculate. The sinus at the posterior angle is very pronounced and less channeled anteriorly. The outer lip is abruptly expanded, very much thickened and separated by a varix a little posterior to its edge. The inner edge of the callus becomes somewhat near the posterior angle, and the attenuation is sufficiently abrupt to give it a somewhat toothed aspect. The columella is reflected as a moderately broad callus and the parietal wall is covered by a strong thick callus which joins the outer lip at the posterior angle.

== Distribution ==
This marine species occurs off Panama, Caribbean Sea.
