= Phosinella cancellata =

Scientific classification
- Kingdom: Animalia
- Phylum: Mollusca
- Class: Gastropoda
- Subclass: Caenogastropoda
- Order: Littorinimorpha
- Family: Rissoinidae
- Genus: Phosinella
- Species: P. cancellata

Binomial name
- Phosinella cancellata (Philippi, 1847)

Synonyms
- Rissoina cancellata Philippi, 1847; Rissoina philippiana Schwartz, 1860; Rissoina elongata Mörch, 1876

Species of gastropod

Phosinella cancellata is a species of small sea snail, a marine gastropod mollusk or micromollusk in the family Rissoinidae.

== Distribution ==
This marine species occurs in the Caribbean Sea, the Gulf of Mexico and the Lesser Antilles.

== Description ==
The maximum recorded shell length is 8 millimetres (0.31 in).

== Habitat ==
Minimum recorded depth is 0.5 metres (20 in). Maximum recorded depth is 106 metres (116 yd).
