= Phosinella clathrata =

Scientific classification
- Kingdom: Animalia
- Phylum: Mollusca
- Class: Gastropoda
- Subclass: Caenogastropoda
- Order: Littorinimorpha
- Family: Rissoinidae
- Genus: Phosinella
- Species: P. clathrata

Binomial name
- Phosinella clathrata (A. Adams, 1851)

Synonyms
- Rissoina clathrata A. Adams, 1853

Species of gastropod

Phosinella clathrata is a species of small sea snail, a marine gastropod mollusc or micromollusc in the family Rissoinidae.

== Distribution ==
This species occurs in the Red Sea and in the Indian Ocean off Madagascar.
