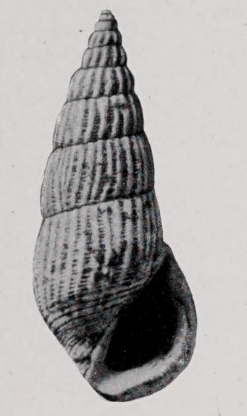
- Shell of Zebinella ame (holotype)

Scientific classification
- Kingdom: Animalia
- Phylum: Mollusca
- Class: Gastropoda
- Subclass: Caenogastropoda
- Order: Littorinimorpha
- Superfamily: Rissooidea
- Family: Rissoinidae
- Genus: Zebinella
- Species: †Z. ame

Binomial name
- †Zebinella ame (Woodring, 1928)

Synonyms
- † Rissoina ame Woodring, 1928

= Zebinella ame =

Species of gastropod

Zebinella ame is an extinct species of minute sea snail, a marine gastropod mollusk or micromollusk in the family Rissoinidae.

== Description ==
The length of the shell attains 5.7 mm, its diameter 2.4 mm.

(Original description) The small shell is moderately slender. The protoconch is stout, consisting of about 2¾ whorls. The parietal callus and the outer lip form a distinct but not constricted posterior channel. The channel across the basal lip does not undercut the columella. The sculpture consists of fine axial ribs, between which lie very fine spiral threads. The axial ribs are progressively more closely spaced. The base of the body whorl is sculptured only with spiral threads.

== Distribution ==
Fossils of this marine species were found in Miocene strata in Jamaica.
