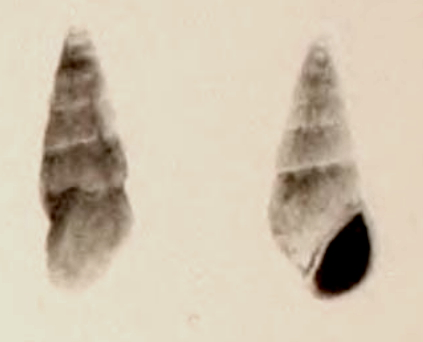
- Shell of Zebinella degrangei (holotype)

Scientific classification
- Kingdom: Animalia
- Phylum: Mollusca
- Class: Gastropoda
- Subclass: Caenogastropoda
- Order: Littorinimorpha
- Superfamily: Rissooidea
- Family: Rissoinidae
- Genus: Zebinella
- Species: Z. degrangei

Binomial name
- Zebinella degrangei (Cossmann & Peyrot, 1919)

Synonyms
- † Rissoina (Zebinella) degrangei Cossmann & Peyrot, 1919; † Rissoina degrangei Cossmann & Peyrot, 1919

= Zebinella degrangei =

Species of gastropod

Zebinella degrangei is an extinct species of minute sea snail, a marine gastropod mollusk or micromollusk in the family Rissoinidae.

== Description ==
The length of the shell attains 12.5 mm, its diameter 3.5 mm.

== Distribution ==
Fossils of this species were found in Neogenic strata in Aquitaine, France.
