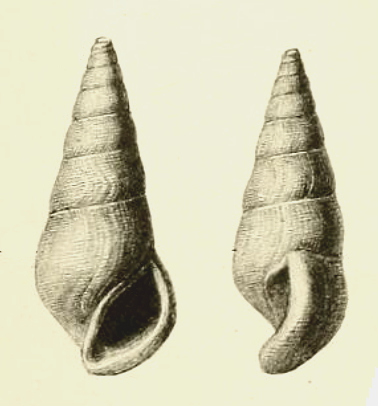
- Shell of Zebinella geikiei (holotype)

Scientific classification
- Kingdom: Animalia
- Phylum: Mollusca
- Class: Gastropoda
- Subclass: Caenogastropoda
- Order: Littorinimorpha
- Superfamily: Rissooidea
- Family: Rissoinidae
- Genus: Zebinella
- Species: Z. geikiei

Binomial name
- Zebinella geikiei (Von Koenen, 1892)

Synonyms
- † Rissoina geikiei Von Koenen, 1892

= Zebinella geikiei =

Species of gastropod

Zebinella geikiei is an extinct species of minute sea snail, a marine gastropod mollusk or micromollusk in the family Rissoinidae.

== Distribution ==
Fossils of this species were found in Lower Oligocene strata in Northern Germany.
