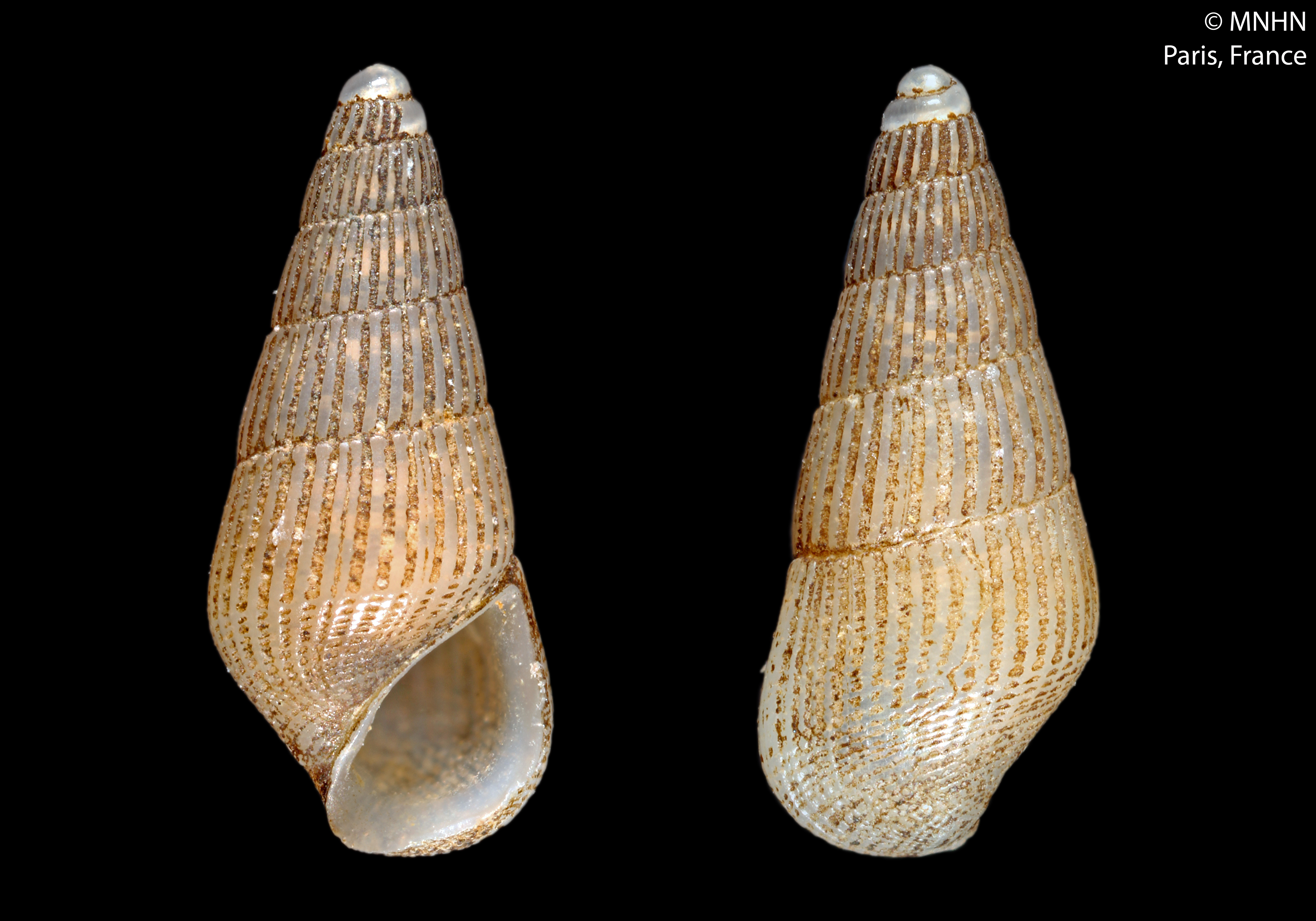
- Shell of Zebinella vitiensis (holotype at MNHN, Paris)

Scientific classification
- Kingdom: Animalia
- Phylum: Mollusca
- Class: Gastropoda
- Subclass: Caenogastropoda
- Order: Littorinimorpha
- Superfamily: Rissooidea
- Family: Rissoinidae
- Genus: Zebinella
- Species: Z. vitiensis

Binomial name
- Zebinella vitiensis Faber, 2015

= Zebinella vitiensis =

Species of gastropod

Zebinella vitiensis is a species of small sea snail, a marine gastropod mollusk or micromollusk in the family Rissoinidae.

== Description ==
The length of the shell attains 3.8 mm.

== Distribution ==
This marine species occurs off Fiji.
