= Zebinella nuda =

Scientific classification
- Kingdom: Animalia
- Phylum: Mollusca
- Class: Gastropoda
- Subclass: Caenogastropoda
- Order: Littorinimorpha
- Superfamily: Rissooidea
- Family: Rissoinidae
- Genus: Zebinella
- Species: †Z. nuda

Binomial name
- †Zebinella nuda (Briart & Cornet, 1887)

Synonyms
- † Rissoina nuda Briart & Cornet, 1887 (basionym, not a Rissoina)

Species of gastropod

Zebinella nuda is an extinct species of minute sea snail, a marine gastropod mollusk or micromollusk in the family Rissoinidae.

== Distribution ==
Fossils of this species were found in Paleocene strata in Mons, Belgium.
