= Zebinella sororcula =

Scientific classification
- Kingdom: Animalia
- Phylum: Mollusca
- Class: Gastropoda
- Subclass: Caenogastropoda
- Order: Littorinimorpha
- Superfamily: Rissooidea
- Family: Rissoinidae
- Genus: Zebinella
- Species: †Z. sororcula

Binomial name
- †Zebinella sororcula (Boettger, 1902)

Synonyms
- † Rissoina sororcula O. Boettger, 1902·; † Rissoina (Zebinella) sororcula O. Boettger, 1902·(original combination)

Species of gastropod

Zebinella sororcula is an extinct species of minute sea snail, a marine gastropod mollusk or micromollusk in the family Rissoinidae.

== Description ==
The length of the shell vries between 5¼ - 6½ mm, its diameter between 2½ - 2¾ mm.

== Distribution ==
Fossils of this marine species were found in Middle Miocene strata in Central Europe.
