= Zebinella angulata =

Scientific classification
- Kingdom: Animalia
- Phylum: Mollusca
- Class: Gastropoda
- Subclass: Caenogastropoda
- Order: Littorinimorpha
- Superfamily: Rissooidea
- Family: Rissoinidae
- Genus: Zebinella
- Species: Z. angulata

Binomial name
- Zebinella angulata (Hertlein & A. M. Strong, 1951)

Synonyms
- Pleneconea angulata Laseron, 1956; Rissoina angulata (Laseron, 1956); Rissoina (Rissoina) angulata (Laseron, 1956)·

Species of gastropod

Zebinella angulata is a species of small sea snail, a marine gastropod mollusk or micromollusk in the family Rissoinidae.

== Distribution ==
This marine species occurs off Papua New Guinea and Australia (Northern Territory, Queensland]
