= Zebinella azaniensis =

Scientific classification
- Kingdom: Animalia
- Phylum: Mollusca
- Class: Gastropoda
- Subclass: Caenogastropoda
- Order: Littorinimorpha
- Superfamily: Rissooidea
- Family: Rissoinidae
- Genus: Zebinella
- Species: †Z. azaniensis

Binomial name
- †Zebinella azaniensis (L. R. Cox, 1927)

Synonyms
- † Rissoina azaniensis L. R. Cox, 1927 superseded combination

Species of gastropod

Zebinella azaniensis is an extinct species of minute sea snail, a marine gastropod mollusk or micromollusk in the family Rissoinidae.

== Distribution ==
This marine species occurs off Zanzibar, Indian Ocean
