= Zebinella vredenburgi =

Scientific classification
- Kingdom: Animalia
- Phylum: Mollusca
- Class: Gastropoda
- Subclass: Caenogastropoda
- Order: Littorinimorpha
- Superfamily: Rissooidea
- Family: Rissoinidae
- Genus: Zebinella
- Species: †Z. vredenburgi

Binomial name
- †Zebinella vredenburgi (Dey, 1962)

Synonyms
- † Rissoina vredenburgi Dey, 1962

Species of gastropod

Zebinella vredenburgi is an extinct species of minute sea snail, a marine gastropod mollusk or micromollusk in the family Rissoinidae.

== Description ==
The length of the shell attains 5 mm, its diameter is 2 mm.

== Distribution ==
Fossils of this species were found in Lower Miocene strata in Kerala, India.
