= Zebinella abbotti =

Scientific classification
- Kingdom: Animalia
- Phylum: Mollusca
- Class: Gastropoda
- Subclass: Caenogastropoda
- Order: Littorinimorpha
- Superfamily: Rissooidea
- Family: Rissoinidae
- Genus: Zebinella
- Species: †Z. abbotti

Binomial name
- †Zebinella abbotti (Ladd, 1966)

Synonyms
- † Rissoina abbotti Faber, 2017 (Basionym); † Rissoina (Rissoina) abbotti Ladd, 1966 ·

Species of gastropod

Zebinella abbotti is an extinct species of minute sea snail, a marine gastropod mollusk or micromollusk in the family Rissoinidae.

== distribution ==
This marine species occurs off Bikini, Marshall Islands.
