= Zebinella eleonorae =

Scientific classification
- Kingdom: Animalia
- Phylum: Mollusca
- Class: Gastropoda
- Subclass: Caenogastropoda
- Order: Littorinimorpha
- Superfamily: Rissooidea
- Family: Rissoinidae
- Genus: Zebinella
- Species: †Z. eleonorae

Binomial name
- †Zebinella eleonorae (Boettger, 1902)

Synonyms
- † Rissoina eleonorae O. Boettger, 1902·; † Rissoina (Zebinella) eleonorae O. Boettger, 1902·(original combination)

Species of gastropod

Zebinella eleonorae is an extinct species of minute sea snail, a marine gastropod mollusk or micromollusk in the family Rissoinidae.

== Description ==
The length of the shell attains 6.5 mm, its diameter 2.5 mm.

Of the three poorly preserved specimens described by Baluk in 2006, one is 5.6 mm high ad 2.22 mm wide while another specimen is 2.8 mm wide.

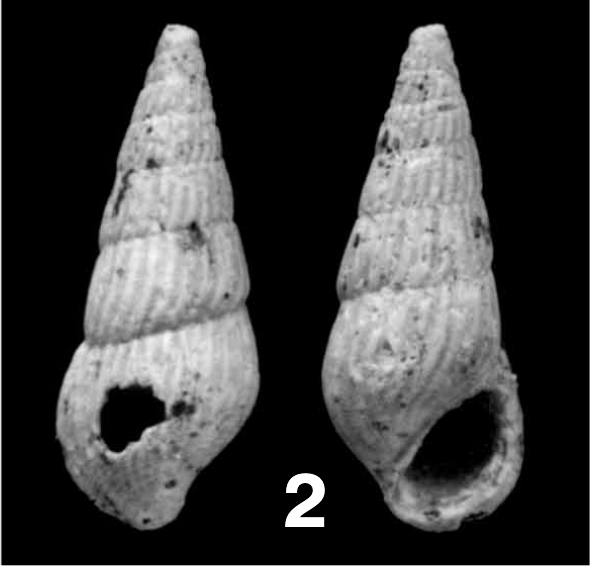
Zebinella eleonorae specimen: Boettger, 1901

Specimens from Kostej and Lapugy in Transylvania described by Boettger in 1901 are characterized by a variable number of axial ribs on the penultimate whorl: 27-41. In 1907, he describes specimens from Korytnica with 24-28 axial ribs.

== Distribution ==
Fossils of this marine species were found in Middle Miocene strata in Central Europe.
