= Zebinella selandica =

Scientific classification
- Kingdom: Animalia
- Phylum: Mollusca
- Class: Gastropoda
- Subclass: Caenogastropoda
- Order: Littorinimorpha
- Superfamily: Rissooidea
- Family: Rissoinidae
- Genus: Zebinella
- Species: †Z. selandica

Binomial name
- †Zebinella selandica Hansen, 2019

Species of gastropod

Zebinella selandica is an extinct species of minute sea snail, a marine gastropod mollusk or micromollusk in the family Rissoinidae.

== Distribution ==
Fossils of this species were found in the upper Maastrichtian Tor Formation at Rødvig, Denmark.
