= Zebinella monilis =

Scientific classification
- Kingdom: Animalia
- Phylum: Mollusca
- Class: Gastropoda
- Subclass: Caenogastropoda
- Order: Littorinimorpha
- Superfamily: Rissooidea
- Family: Rissoinidae
- Genus: Zebinella
- Species: Z. monilis

Binomial name
- Zebinella monilis (A. Adams, 1853)

Synonyms
- Rissoina monilis A. Adams, 1853 (basionym)

Species of gastropod

Zebinella monilis is a species of minute sea snail, a marine gastropod mollusk or micromollusk in the family Rissoinidae.

== Distribution ==
This marine species occurs off the Philippines.
