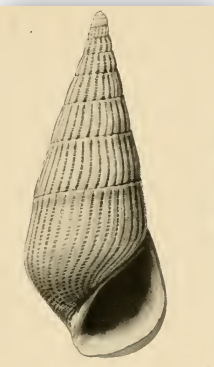
- Shell of Zebinella barthelowi (holotype)

Scientific classification
- Kingdom: Animalia
- Phylum: Mollusca
- Class: Gastropoda
- Subclass: Caenogastropoda
- Order: Littorinimorpha
- Superfamily: Rissooidea
- Family: Rissoinidae
- Genus: Zebinella
- Species: Z. barthelowi

Binomial name
- Zebinella barthelowi (Bartsch, 1915)

Synonyms
- Rissoina barthelowi Bartsch, 1915 ·

= Zebinella barthelowi =

Species of gastropod

Zebinella barthelowi is a species of small sea snail, a marine gastropod mollusk or micromollusk in the family Rissoinidae.

== Description ==
The length of the shell attains 7 mm, its diameter 3 mm.

(Original description) The bluish-white shell is very regularly elongate-conic. The protoconch consists of 3 whorls, well rounded, smooth. The postnuclear whorls are decidedly appressed at the summit and slightly rounded. The first two whorls show a strong spiral cord which becomes decidedly weakened on the third whorl and disappears on the fourth.

The axial sculpture consists of closely placed somewhat sinuous, rounded ribs which are much wider than the spaces which separate them, on the later whorls. On the first three whorls the intercostal spaces are about twice as wide as the ribs. Of these ribs 16 occur upon the first and second, 18 upon the third, 24 upon the fourth, 30 upon the fifth, and 38 upon the sixth and penultimate whorl.

The intercostal spaces are crossed by spiral lirations, of which three occur between the summit and the shoulder on the first three whorls and three between the shoulder and the base of the same whorls. These spiral threads become less strong on the succeeding whorls, and more closely spaced. On the body whorl 15 are present between the summit and the periphery.

The spiral threads are not quite as wide as the spaces that separate them. The sutures are moderately impressed. The periphery of the body whorl is slightly angulated.

The base of the shell is rather short and well rounded, marked by the continuations of the axial ribs, and 20 spiral cords which become successively stronger from the periphery to the umbilical area. The aperture is very oblique, decidedly channeled at the posterior angle and at the junction of the columella and the basal lip. The outer lip is decidedly twisted, reinforced immediately behind the edge with a thick callus, posterior portion drawn forward into a claw-shaped element. The columella is short, twisted, reflected over and appressed to the base. The parietal wall is covered with a thick callus, which renders the peritreme complete.

== Distribution ==
This marine species occurs in the Pacific Ocean off Lower California and in the Caribbean Sea off Guadeloupe
