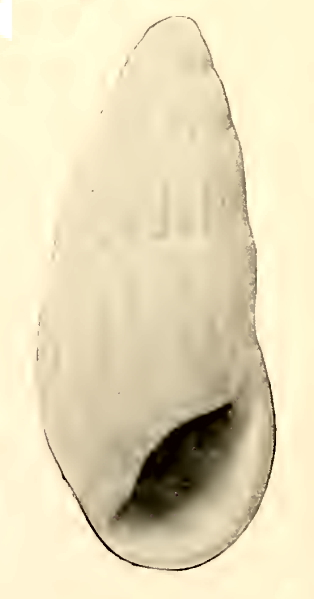
- Shell of Zebinella janus (holotype)

Scientific classification
- Kingdom: Animalia
- Phylum: Mollusca
- Class: Gastropoda
- Subclass: Caenogastropoda
- Order: Littorinimorpha
- Superfamily: Rissooidea
- Family: Rissoinidae
- Genus: Zebinella
- Species: Z. janus

Binomial name
- Zebinella janus (C. B. Adams, 1852)

Synonyms
- Rissoa janus C. B. Adams, 1852 (basionym); Rissoina janus (C. B. Adams, 1852)

= Zebinella janus =

Species of gastropod

Zebinella janus is a species of small sea snail, a marine gastropod mollusk or micromollusk in the family Rissoinidae.

== Description ==
(Original description) The white shell is long and ovate conic. Anteriorly it is covered with fine crowded spiral striae. Elsewhere it is covered with small crowded transverse ribs, which on the body whorl appear merely as transverse stria becoming obsolete near the periphery. The apex is acute. The outlines of the spire are moderately curvilinear. It contains nine whorls, moderately convex, with a lightly impressed suture. The aperture is large, oblique, moderately effuse below, more deeply effuse above. The outer lip is much advanced along the middle, thickened by a broad stout varix. The umbilicus is wanting.

The type of Z. janus in the Amherst collection, collected by C. B. Adams, at Panama, is a very badly worn medium sized shell, in which the ribs have been worn down to such an extent that one can scarcely count them. There are probably 20 on each of the last 2 whorls. It is absolutely impossible to decide whether spiral sculpture may have been present or absent.

== Distribution ==
This marine species occurs off Panama, Caribbean Sea.
