= Phosinella seguenziana =

Scientific classification
- Kingdom: Animalia
- Phylum: Mollusca
- Class: Gastropoda
- Subclass: Caenogastropoda
- Order: Littorinimorpha
- Family: Rissoinidae
- Genus: Phosinella
- Species: P. seguenziana

Binomial name
- Phosinella seguenziana (Issel, 1869)

Synonyms
- Rissoina seguenzai (Incorrect subsequent spelling); Rissoina seguenziana Issel, 1869

Species of gastropod

Phosinella seguenziana is a species of small sea snail, a marine gastropod mollusc or micromollusc in the family Rissoinidae.

== Distribution ==
This species occurs in the Red Sea.
