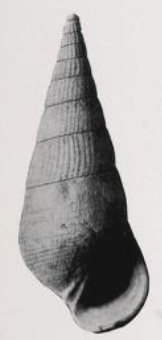
- Shell of Zebinella oligopleura (holotype)

Scientific classification
- Kingdom: Animalia
- Phylum: Mollusca
- Class: Gastropoda
- Subclass: Caenogastropoda
- Order: Littorinimorpha
- Superfamily: Rissooidea
- Family: Rissoinidae
- Genus: Zebinella
- Species: †Z. oligopleura

Binomial name
- †Zebinella oligopleura (Woodring, 1928)

Synonyms
- † Rissoina oligopleura Woodring, 1928

= Zebinella oligopleura =

Species of gastropod

Zebinella oligopleura is an extinct species of minute sea snail, a marine gastropod mollusk or micromollusk in the family Rissoinidae.

== Description ==
The length of the shell attains 9.7 mm, its diameter 3.6 mm.

(Original description) The shell is large. The body whorl is subangulated at the periphery. The later whorls of the spire are almost flat. The protoconch consists of about 2¾ whorls. The labial varix is heavy. The anterior channel is wide. The sculpture is very weak except on the early whorls, which bear crowded axial ribs, between which lie spiral pits. After the third or fourth whorl the sculpture gradually disappears, but on some specimens can be faintly seen even on body whorl.

== Distribution ==
Fossils of this marine species were found in Miocene strata in Jamaica.
