= Zebinella heterolira =

Scientific classification
- Kingdom: Animalia
- Phylum: Mollusca
- Class: Gastropoda
- Subclass: Caenogastropoda
- Order: Littorinimorpha
- Superfamily: Rissooidea
- Family: Rissoinidae
- Genus: Zebinella
- Species: †Z. heterolira

Binomial name
- †Zebinella heterolira (Laws, 1941)

Synonyms
- † Rissoina heterolira Laws, 1941

Species of gastropod

Zebinella heterolira is an extinct species of minute sea snail, a marine gastropod mollusk or micromollusk in the family Rissoinidae.

== Description ==
The length of the shell attains 5.1 mm, its diameter 2 mm. It is moderately sized, spirally lirate, and axially costate shell. The shell has a high spire, about twice the height of the aperture, with lightly convex outlines and a flat-topped early whorls structure. The last two whorls bulge anteriorly, with a moderately distinct suture and clasping last whorl. The aperture is angled behind, strongly notched below the columella, and expands laterally at the base.

== Distribution ==
Fossils of this species were found at Kaipara, Northern New Zealand.
