= Zebinella fragileplicata =

Scientific classification
- Kingdom: Animalia
- Phylum: Mollusca
- Class: Gastropoda
- Subclass: Caenogastropoda
- Order: Littorinimorpha
- Superfamily: Rissooidea
- Family: Rissoinidae
- Genus: Zebinella
- Species: Z. fragileplicata

Binomial name
- Zebinella fragileplicata (Beets, 1941)

Synonyms
- † Melania (Melanoides) fragileplicata Beets, 1941; † Melanoides fragileplicata (Beets, 1941)

Species of gastropod

Zebinella fragileplicata is an extinct species of minute sea snail, a marine gastropod mollusk or micromollusk in the family Rissoinidae.

== Description ==
The length of the shell attains 12 mm, its diameter 5 mm.

== Distribution ==
Fossils of this species were found in Early Miocene strata in Borneo, Indonesia.
