= Zebinella semidecussata =

Scientific classification
- Kingdom: Animalia
- Phylum: Mollusca
- Class: Gastropoda
- Subclass: Caenogastropoda
- Order: Littorinimorpha
- Superfamily: Rissooidea
- Family: Rissoinidae
- Genus: Zebinella
- Species: †Z. semidecussata

Binomial name
- †Zebinella semidecussata (Boettger, 1902)

Synonyms
- † Rissoina (Rissoina) semidecussata Boettger, 1902

Species of gastropod

Zebinella semidecussata is an extinct species of minute sea snail, a marine gastropod mollusk or micromollusk in the family Rissoinidae.

== Distribution ==
Fossils of this species were found in Middle Miocene strata in Central Europe.
