= Zebinella extranea =

Scientific classification
- Kingdom: Animalia
- Phylum: Mollusca
- Class: Gastropoda
- Subclass: Caenogastropoda
- Order: Littorinimorpha
- Superfamily: Rissooidea
- Family: Rissoinidae
- Genus: Zebinella
- Species: Z. extranea

Binomial name
- Zebinella extranea (Eichwald, 1830))

Synonyms
- † Rissoa extranea Eichwald, 1830; † Rissoina extranea (Eichwald, 1830) superseded combination

Species of gastropod

Zebinella extranea is an extinct species of minute sea snail, a marine gastropod mollusk or micromollusk in the family Rissoinidae.

== Distribution ==
Fossils of this species were found in Middle Miocene strata in Hungary and Turkey
