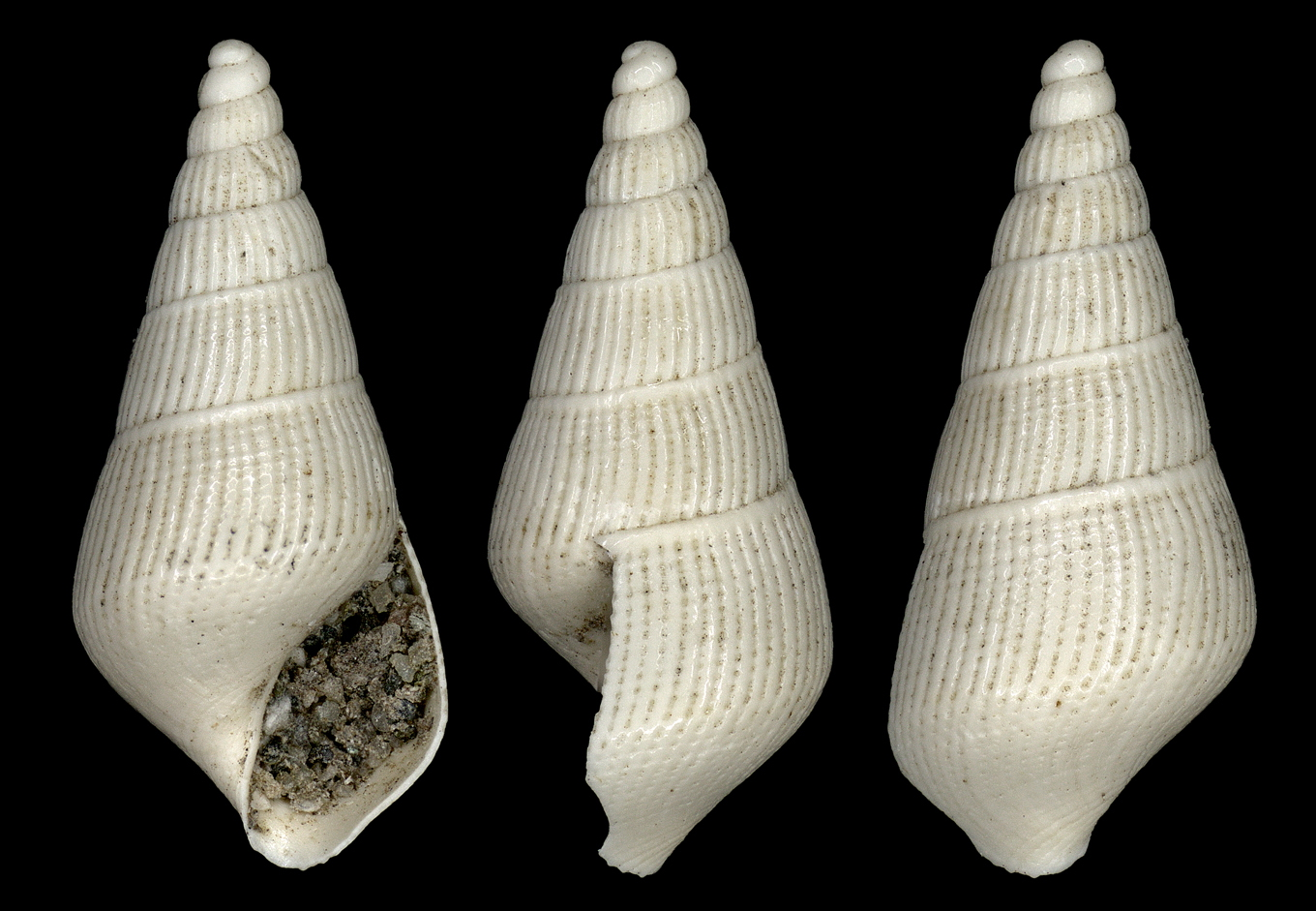
- Shell of Zebinella mimbastaensis (paratype)

Scientific classification
- Kingdom: Animalia
- Phylum: Mollusca
- Class: Gastropoda
- Subclass: Caenogastropoda
- Order: Littorinimorpha
- Superfamily: Rissooidea
- Family: Rissoinidae
- Genus: Zebinella
- Species: †Z. mimbastaensis

Binomial name
- †Zebinella mimbastaensis (Lozouet, 2011)

Synonyms
- † Rissoina mimbastaensis Lozouet, 2011

= Zebinella mimbastaensis =

Species of gastropod

Zebinella mimbastaensis is an extinct species of minute sea snail, a marine gastropod mollusk or micromollusk in the family Rissoinidae.

== Distribution ==
Fossils of this species were found in Miocene strata in Aquitaine, France.
