= Zebinella liriope =

Scientific classification
- Kingdom: Animalia
- Phylum: Mollusca
- Class: Gastropoda
- Subclass: Caenogastropoda
- Order: Littorinimorpha
- Superfamily: Rissooidea
- Family: Rissoinidae
- Genus: Zebinella
- Species: †Z. liriope

Binomial name
- †Zebinella liriope (Olsson & Harbison, 1953)

Synonyms
- † Rissoina liriope Olsson & Harbison, 1953

Species of gastropod

Zebinella liriope is an extinct species of minute sea snail, a marine gastropod mollusk or micromollusk in the family Rissoinidae.

== Distribution ==
Fossils of this species were found in Pliocene strata in Florida, USA.
