= Zebinella mijana =

Scientific classification
- Kingdom: Animalia
- Phylum: Mollusca
- Class: Gastropoda
- Subclass: Caenogastropoda
- Order: Littorinimorpha
- Superfamily: Rissooidea
- Family: Rissoinidae
- Genus: Zebinella
- Species: †Z. mijana

Binomial name
- †Zebinella mijana (Ladd, 1966)

Synonyms
- † Rissoina mijana Ladd, 1966 (Basionym); † Rissoina (Rissoina) mijana Ladd, 1966 ·

Species of gastropod

Zebinella mijana is an extinct species of minute sea snail, a marine gastropod mollusk or micromollusk in the family Rissoinidae.

== Distribution ==
This marine species occurs off Enewetak Atoll, Marshall Islands.
