= Zebinella tehuacana =

Scientific classification
- Kingdom: Animalia
- Phylum: Mollusca
- Class: Gastropoda
- Subclass: Caenogastropoda
- Order: Littorinimorpha
- Superfamily: Rissooidea
- Family: Rissoinidae
- Genus: Zebinella
- Species: †Z. tehuacana

Binomial name
- †Zebinella tehuacana Garvie, 2021

Species of gastropod

Zebinella tehuacana is an extinct species of minute sea snail, a marine gastropod mollusk or micromollusk in the family Rissoinidae.

== Distribution ==
Fossils of this marine species were found in Paleogene strata in Texas, USA.
