= Zebinella trigonostoma =

Scientific classification
- Kingdom: Animalia
- Phylum: Mollusca
- Class: Gastropoda
- Subclass: Caenogastropoda
- Order: Littorinimorpha
- Superfamily: Rissooidea
- Family: Rissoinidae
- Genus: Zebinella
- Species: Z. trigonostoma

Binomial name
- Zebinella trigonostoma (Boettger, 1893)

Synonyms
- Rissoina (Zebinella) trigonostoma O. Boettger, 1893

Species of gastropod

Zebinella trigonostoma is a species of small sea snail, a marine gastropod mollusk or micromollusk in the family Rissoinidae.

== Description ==
The length of the shell attains 3.25 - 4 mm; its diameter 1.5 - 1.75 mm.

== Distribution ==
This marine species occurs off the Philippines.
