= Zebinella brandenburgi =

Scientific classification
- Kingdom: Animalia
- Phylum: Mollusca
- Class: Gastropoda
- Subclass: Caenogastropoda
- Order: Littorinimorpha
- Superfamily: Rissooidea
- Family: Rissoinidae
- Genus: Zebinella
- Species: †Z. brandenburgi

Binomial name
- †Zebinella brandenburgi (Boettger, 1896)

Synonyms
- † Rissoina brandenburgi O. Boettger, 1896

Species of gastropod

Zebinella brandenburgi is an extinct species of minute sea snail, a marine gastropod mollusk or micromollusk in the family Rissoinidae.

== Description ==
The length of the shell attains 15.5 mm, its diameter is 6 mm.

Its functional type is Benthos.

Its feeding type is grazer and detritus feeder.

== Distribution ==
Fossils of this marine species were found off Banat in eastern Central Europe.
