= Zebinella formosana =

Scientific classification
- Kingdom: Animalia
- Phylum: Mollusca
- Class: Gastropoda
- Subclass: Caenogastropoda
- Order: Littorinimorpha
- Superfamily: Rissooidea
- Family: Rissoinidae
- Genus: Zebinella
- Species: Z. formosana

Binomial name
- Zebinella formosana (Nomura, 1935)

Synonyms
- † Rissoina formosana Nomura, 1935

Species of gastropod

Zebinella formosana is an extinct species of minute sea snail, a marine gastropod mollusk or micromollusk in the family Rissoinidae.

== Distribution ==
Fossils of this species were found in Taiwan.
