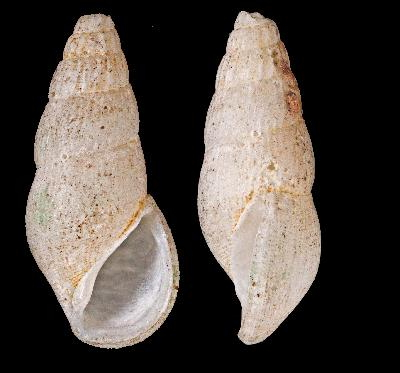
- Shell of Zebinella mohrensterni (syntype at the MNHN, Paris))

Scientific classification
- Kingdom: Animalia
- Phylum: Mollusca
- Class: Gastropoda
- Subclass: Caenogastropoda
- Order: Littorinimorpha
- Superfamily: Rissooidea
- Family: Rissoinidae
- Genus: Zebinella
- Species: Z. mohrensterni

Binomial name
- Zebinella mohrensterni (Deshayes, 1863)

Synonyms
- Rissoina mohrensterni Deshayes, 1863

= Zebinella mohrensterni =

Species of gastropod

Zebinella mohrensterni is a species of small sea snail, a marine gastropod mollusk or micromollusk in the family Rissoinidae.

== Description ==
The length of the shell attains 4 mm, its diameter 2 mm.

(Original description in French) The shell is oblong, conical, subturriculate, with a pointed apex. It is composed of seven fairly wide, convex whorls, joined by a linear and simple suture. The body whorl is large, it constitutes almost half of the total length. It is obtuse in front and shows no trace of an umbilical slit at the base. The entire surface of the shell is very elegantly latticed, by the meeting at right angles, of fine tight and regular longitudinal ribs and of excessively fine transverse striations no less regular; at the base of the body whorl, the ribs become circumvented and tend to disappear, the transverse striations, on the contrary, persist. The aperture is oblong, semi-lunar. The outer lip is thick, obtuse and thrown forward. It joins a very short columella in forming with it a small, inconspicuous interior notch. This small shell is a uniform, semi-transparent milky white.

== Distribution ==
This marine species occurs off Réunion, Indian Ocean.
