= Zebinella alarconi =

Scientific classification
- Kingdom: Animalia
- Phylum: Mollusca
- Class: Gastropoda
- Subclass: Caenogastropoda
- Order: Littorinimorpha
- Superfamily: Rissooidea
- Family: Rissoinidae
- Genus: Zebinella
- Species: Z. alarconi

Binomial name
- Zebinella alarconi (Hertlein & A. M. Strong, 1951)

Synonyms
- Rissoina alarconi Hertlein & A. M. Strong, 1951

Species of gastropod

Zebinella alarconi is a species of small sea snail, a marine gastropod mollusk or micromollusk in the family Rissoinidae.

== Description ==
The length of the shell attains 4.8 mm, its diameter is 1.8 mm.

== Distribution ==
This species occurs in the Pacific Ocean off Costa Rica and Nicaragua.
