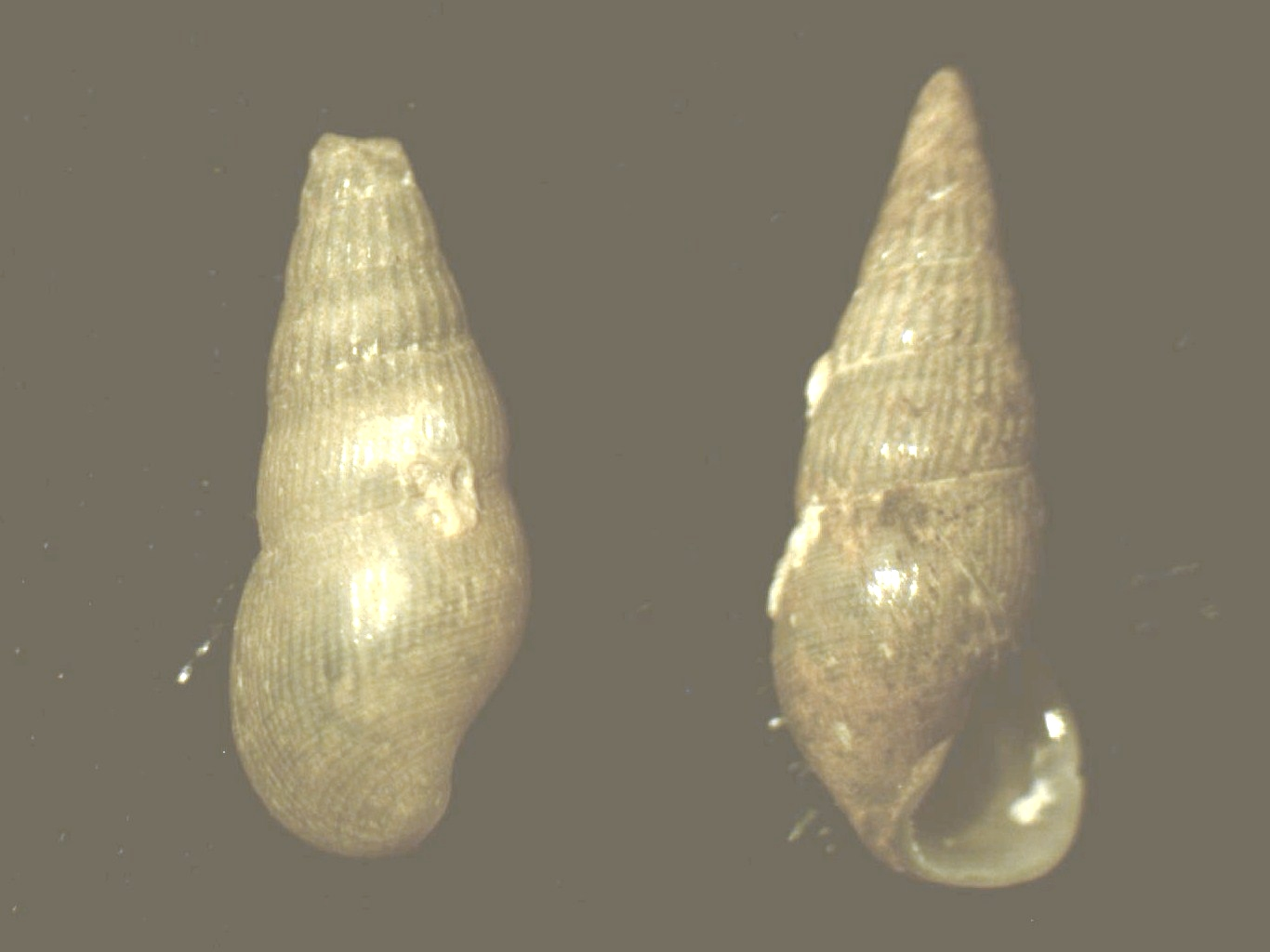
- Shell of Zebinella decussata

Scientific classification
- Kingdom: Animalia
- Phylum: Mollusca
- Class: Gastropoda
- Subclass: Caenogastropoda
- Order: Littorinimorpha
- Superfamily: Rissooidea
- Family: Rissoinidae
- Genus: Zebinella; Mörch, 1876

Type species
- Helix decussata Montagu, 1803

Synonyms
- Monostigma Arango, 1880 superseded combination (junior subjective synonym); Pleneconea Laseron, 1956 (Pleneconea is a junior synonym of Zebinella); Rissoina (Zebinella) Mörch, 1876; Zymalata Laseron, 1956

= Zebinella =

Genus of gastropods

Zebinella is a genus of minute sea snails, marine gastropod mollusks or micromollusks, in the family Rissoinidae.

== Description ==
The shell is moderately small and slender. The protoconch consists of about 2½ smooth whorls. The outer lip is varicose, extending forward. The channel across the basal lip is shallow, slightly undercutting the columella. The parietal wall is callused, forming a channel with the outer lip. The sculpture consists of fine axial ribs, between which lie fine spiral threads. Aside from the difference in sculpture, the outer lip is more flaring than in Rissoina s. s., and the channel across the basal lip is wider and shallower, and does not undercut the columella so strongly.

== Species ==
Species within the genus Zebinella include:

- † Zebinella abbotti (Ladd, 1866)
- Zebinella alarconi (Hertlein & Strong, 1951)
- Zebinella albida (C. B. Adams, 1845)
- Zebinella allemani (Bartsch, 1931)
- † Zebinella ame (Woodring, 1928)
- Zebinella angulata (Laseron, 1956)
- † Zebinella azaniensis (Cox, 1927)
- Zebinella barthelowi (Bartsch, 1915)
- † Zebinella brandenburgi (Boettger, 1896)
- † Zebinella cochlearina (Meunier, 1880)
- † Zebinella constantinensis (Cossmann & Pissarro, 1902) †
- † Zebinella corrugata (Cossmann & Pissarro, 1902)
- Zebinella craticula Faber, 2018
- Zebinella decussata (Montagu, 1803)
- † Zebinella degrangei (Cossmann & Peyrot, 1919)
- Zebinella dilatata (Faber, 2017)
- Zebinella elegantula (Angas, 1880)
- † Zebinella eleonorae (Boettger, 1901)
- † Zebinella extranea (Eichwald, 1830)
- † Zebinella formosana (Nomura, 1935)
- † Zebinella fragileplicata (Beets, 1941)
- † Zebinella geikiei (Von Koenen, 1892)
- Zebinella guadeloupensis Faber & Moolenbeek, 2013
- Zebinella herosae Faber, 2015
- † Zebinella heterolira (Laws, 1941)
- Zebinella janus (C. B. Adams, 1852)
- † Zebinella liriope (Olsson & Harbison, 1953)
- † Zebinella mijana (Ladd, 1866)
- † Zebinella mimbastaensis (Lozouet, 2011)
- † Zebinella minuta (Gabb, 1873)
- Zebinella moellendorffi (Boettger, 1893)
- Zebinella mohrensterni (Deshayes, 1863)
- Zebinella monilis (A. Adams, 1853)
- † Zebinella nuda (Briart & Cornet, 1887)
- † Zebinella oligopleura (Woodring, 1928)
- † Zebinella oyamai Itoigawa & Nishimoto, 1984
- Zebinella paumotuensis (Couturier, 1907)
- † Zebinella planata (Dall, 1892)
- Zebinella princeps (C. B. Adams, 1850)
- Zebinella punctifera Faber, 2015
- † Zebinella recticostulata (Cossmann & Peyrot, 1919)
- † Zebinella selandica Hansen, 2019
- † Zebinella semidecussata (Boettger, 1902)
- Zebinella sigmifer (Mörch, 1876)
- † Zebinella sororcula (Boettger, 1901)
- Zebinella striatocostata (d’Orbigny, 1842)
- Zebinella striosa (C. B. Adams, 1850)
- † Zebinella sturanii (Zunino & Pavia, 2009)
- † Zebinella tehuacana Garvie, 2021
- † Zebinella tenuicancellata (Briart & Cornet, 1887)
- Zebinella townsendi (Bartsch, 1915)
- Zebinella trigonostoma (Boettger, 1893)
- † Zebinella varicosa (Boettger, 1906)
- Zebinella vitiensis Faber, 2015
- † Zebinella vredenburgi (Dey, 1962)
- Zebinella zeltneri (de Folin, 1867)

Species brought into synonymy

- Zebinella affinis (C. B. Adams, 1845): synonym of Zebinella striatocostata (d'Orbigny, 1842)
- Zebinella affinis (Garrett, 1873): synonym of Zebinella tenuistriata (Pease, 1868)
- Zebinella concinna (Laseron, 1956): synonym of Rissoina evanida G. Nevill & H. Nevill, 1874 (junior subjective synonym)
- Zebinella cylindrica (Preston, 1908): synonym of Rissoina andamanica Weinkauff, 1881 (junior subjective synonym)
- Zebinella evanida (G. Nevill & H. Nevill, 1881): synonym of Rissoina evanida G. Nevill & H. Nevill, 1874 (superseded combination)
- † Zebinella obsoleta (M. Hörnes, 1856): synonym of † Chiliostigma obsoleta (M. Hörnes, 1856)
- † Zebinella planicosta (Von Koenen, 1892): synonym of † Zebinella cochlearina (Meunier, 1880) (Junior synonym)
- Zebinella tenuistriata (Pease, 1868): synonym of Rissoina tenuistriata Pease, 1868 (superseded combination)

Taxon inquirendum

- Zebinella retusa (W. H. Turton, 1932)
