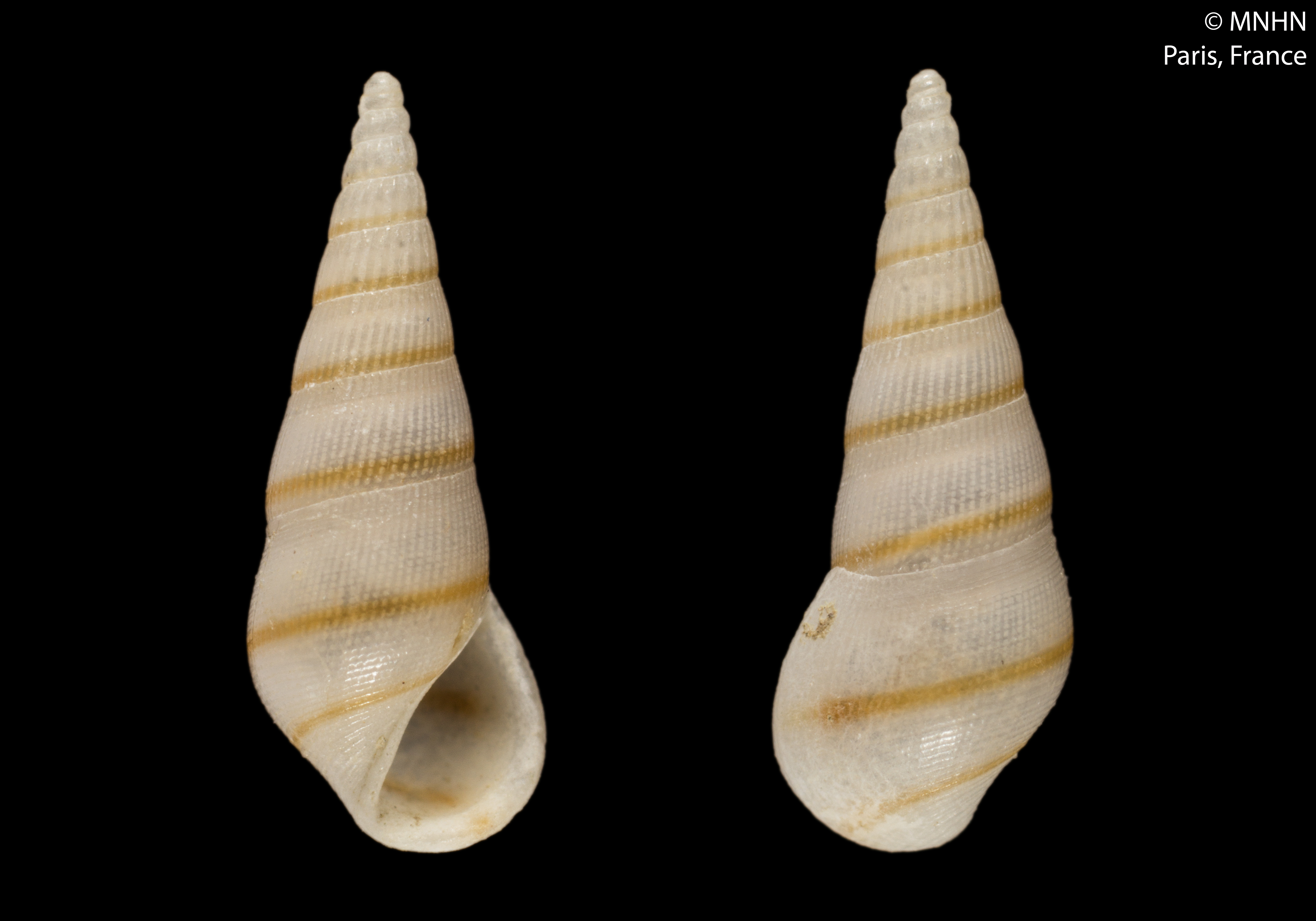
- Shell of Zebinella herosae (holotype at MNHN, Paris)

Scientific classification
- Kingdom: Animalia
- Phylum: Mollusca
- Class: Gastropoda
- Subclass: Caenogastropoda
- Order: Littorinimorpha
- Superfamily: Rissooidea
- Family: Rissoinidae
- Genus: Zebinella
- Species: Z. herosae

Binomial name
- Zebinella herosae Faber, 2015

= Zebinella herosae =

Species of gastropod

Zebinella herosae is a species of minute sea snail, a marine gastropod mollusk or micromollusk in the family Rissoinidae.

== Description ==
The length of the shell attains 6.5 mm.

== Distribution ==
This marine species occurs off Papua New Guinea.
