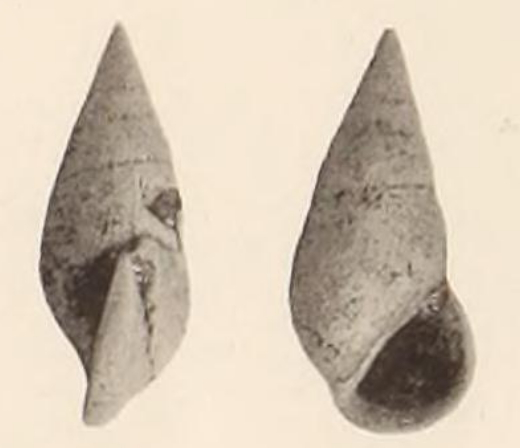
- Shell of Zebinella constantinensis (holotype)

Scientific classification
- Kingdom: Animalia
- Phylum: Mollusca
- Class: Gastropoda
- Subclass: Caenogastropoda
- Order: Littorinimorpha
- Superfamily: Rissooidea
- Family: Rissoinidae
- Genus: Zebinella
- Species: †Z. constantinensis

Binomial name
- †Zebinella constantinensis (Cossmann & Pissarro, 1902)

Synonyms
- † Rissoina (Zebinella) constantinensis Cossmann & Pissarro, 1902; † Rissoina constantinensis Cossmann & Pissarro, 1902

= Zebinella constantinensis =

Species of gastropod

Zebinella constantinensis is an extinct species of minute sea snail, a marine gastropod mollusk or micromollusk in the family Rissoinidae.

== Description ==
The length of the shell attains 11 mm.

== Distribution ==
Fossils of this marine species were found in Eocene strata in Cotentin, France.
