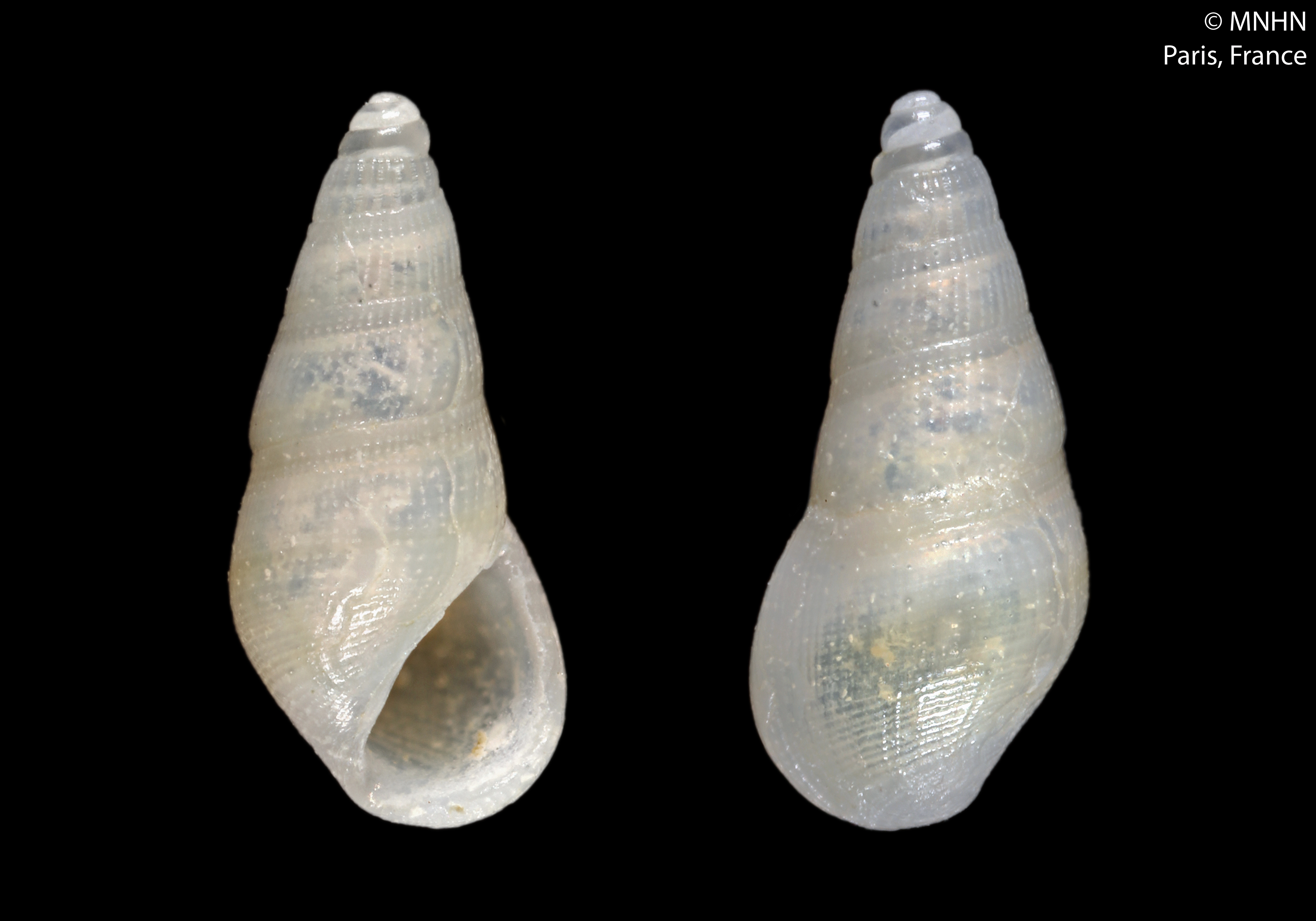
- Shell of Zebinella punctifera (holotype at the MNHN, Paris)

Scientific classification
- Kingdom: Animalia
- Phylum: Mollusca
- Class: Gastropoda
- Subclass: Caenogastropoda
- Order: Littorinimorpha
- Superfamily: Rissooidea
- Family: Rissoinidae
- Genus: Zebinella
- Species: Z. punctifera

Binomial name
- Zebinella punctifera Faber, 2015

= Zebinella punctifera =

Species of gastropod

Zebinella punctifera is a species of small sea snail, a marine gastropod mollusk or micromollusk in the family Rissoinidae.

== Description ==
The length of the shell attains 2.8 mm.

== Distribution ==
This marine species occurs off the Philippines.
