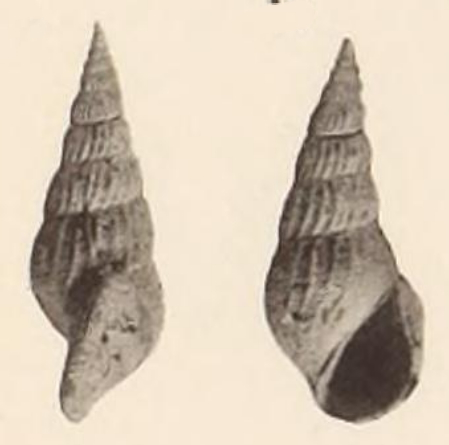
- Shell of Zebinella corrugata (holotype)

Scientific classification
- Kingdom: Animalia
- Phylum: Mollusca
- Class: Gastropoda
- Subclass: Caenogastropoda
- Order: Littorinimorpha
- Superfamily: Rissooidea
- Family: Rissoinidae
- Genus: Zebinella
- Species: †Z. corrugata

Binomial name
- †Zebinella corrugata (Cossmann & Pissarro, 1902)

Synonyms
- † Rissoina (Zebinella) corrugata Cossmann & Pissarro, 1902; † Rissoina corrugata Cossmann & Pissarro, 1902

= Zebinella corrugata =

Species of gastropod

Zebinella corrugata is an extinct species of minute sea snail, a marine gastropod mollusk or micromollusk in the family Rissoinidae.

== Description ==
The length of the shell attains 10 mm, its diameter 4 mm.

(Original description in French) The size is quite large; the shape is squat and conical; the protoconch is smooth, paucispiral (few-whorled), and is terminated by an obtuse nucleus; there are eight very convex whorls, whose height is less than half of their width, separated by deep sutures, which are bordered above by a small bead; the whorls are decorated with curved, prominent, and almost rough riblets, which do not correspond from one whorl to the next, and with tight, unequal, and slightly wavy spiral threads. The body whorl is large, oval, equal to half of the total height, and is rounded at the base, on which the ornamentation extends up to its upper part. The aperture is wide, with a narrow groove in the posterior angle; the outer lip is strongly thickened externally, oblique, and inclined forward; the columella is slightly excavated in its lower part, and is furnished with a dentiform projection in its upper part, before it attaches to the free edge of the aperture; the columellar margin is callous, and is slightly detached from the base.

Shells of the genus Zebinella are moderately small and slender. They have 2½ smooth whorls with a calloused parietal wall. There are fine axial ribs around fine spiral threads. The outer lip is varicose and extends forward with a shallow channel across the basal lip, slightly undercutting the columella. The parietal wall is callused and forms a channel with the outer lip.

== Distribution ==
Fossils of this marine species were found in Eocene strata in Cotentin, France.
