= Zebinella oyamai =

Scientific classification
- Kingdom: Animalia
- Phylum: Mollusca
- Class: Gastropoda
- Subclass: Caenogastropoda
- Order: Littorinimorpha
- Superfamily: Rissooidea
- Family: Rissoinidae
- Genus: Zebinella
- Species: †Z. oyamai

Binomial name
- †Zebinella oyamai Itoigawa & Nishimoto, 1984

Species of gastropod

Zebinella oyamai is an extinct species of minute sea snail, a marine gastropod mollusk or micromollusk in the family Rissoinidae.

== Distribution ==
Fossils of this species were found in Miocene strata in Central Japan.
