= Zebinella craticula =

Scientific classification
- Kingdom: Animalia
- Phylum: Mollusca
- Class: Gastropoda
- Subclass: Caenogastropoda
- Order: Littorinimorpha
- Superfamily: Rissooidea
- Family: Rissoinidae
- Genus: Zebinella
- Species: Z. craticula

Binomial name
- Zebinella craticula Faber, 2018

Species of gastropod

Zebinella craticula is a species of minute sea snail, a marine gastropod mollusk or micromollusk in the family Rissoinidae.

== Distribution ==
This marine species occurs off Southern Madagascar
