= Zebinella moellendorffi =

Scientific classification
- Kingdom: Animalia
- Phylum: Mollusca
- Class: Gastropoda
- Subclass: Caenogastropoda
- Order: Littorinimorpha
- Superfamily: Rissooidea
- Family: Rissoinidae
- Genus: Zebinella
- Species: Z. moellendorffi

Binomial name
- Zebinella moellendorffi (O. Boettger, 1893)

Synonyms
- Rissoina moellendorffi O. Boettger, 1893; Rissoina (Zebinella) moellendorffi Boettger, 1893

Species of gastropod

Zebinella moellendorffi is a species of small sea snail, a marine gastropod mollusk or micromollusk in the family Rissoinidae.

== Description ==
The length of the shell attains 6.5 mm, its diameter 2.5 mm.

(Original description in Latin) The shell is an elongated-turreted, solid white structure with a very slender spire and a decollated apex. It has 7.5 remaining whorls that increase slowly, with the upper ones flattened and separated by a barely visible suture, while the lower whorls are somewhat more convex and separated by a more distinct suture. The shell is finely ribbed with approximately 32 narrow, slightly oblique ribs on the penultimate whorl, and also exhibits very fine spiral lines. The body whorl is somewhat inflated but compressed and narrowed at the base, with nearly twice as many ribs and more pronounced spiral lines creating a reticulated pattern. Before the aperture, the shell ascends and flares broadly, forming a campanulate structure that is about one-third the height of the shell. The aperture is highly oblique, subtriangular, constricted, and expanded laterally. The peristome is very strongly thickened with a callus, protruded in the middle, and encircled externally by a thick, reticulated varix. The columella is slightly concave.

== Distribution ==
This marine species occurs off the Philippines.
