= R. princeps =

R. princeps may refer to:

- Rissoina princeps, a sea snail species
- Roystonea princeps, the Morass cabbage palm or Morass royal palm, a palm species endemic to western Jamaica
