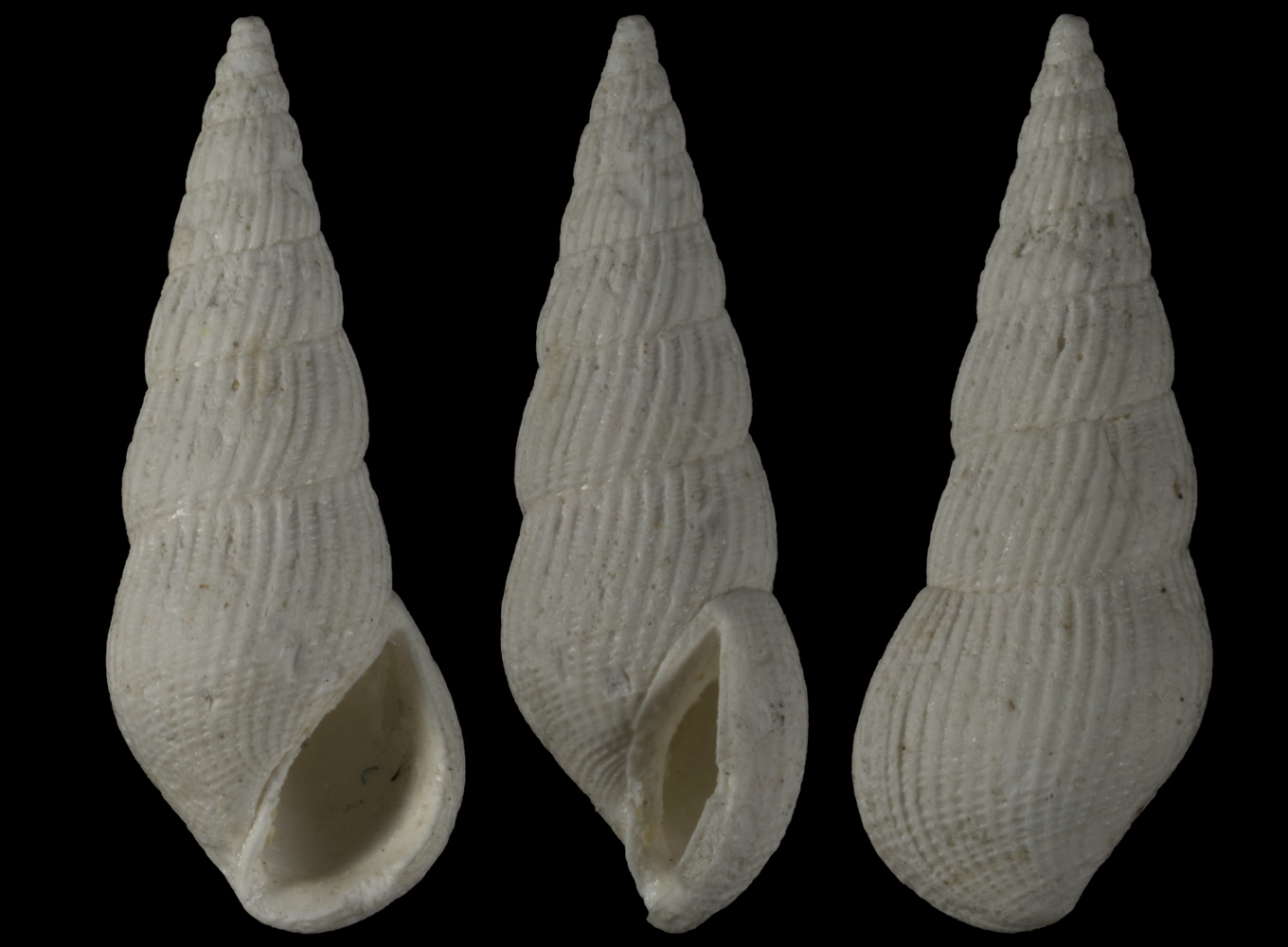
- Shell of Zebinella cochlearina (specimen at MNHN, Paris)

Scientific classification
- Kingdom: Animalia
- Phylum: Mollusca
- Class: Gastropoda
- Subclass: Caenogastropoda
- Order: Littorinimorpha
- Superfamily: Rissooidea
- Family: Rissoinidae
- Genus: Zebinella
- Species: †Z. cochlearina

Binomial name
- †Zebinella cochlearina (Meunier, 1880)

Synonyms
- † Rissoina cochlearina Meunier, 1880 (Basionym, taxon does not belong to Rissoina); † Rissoina planicosta Von Koenen, 1892 (Zebinella raised to full genus); † Zebinella planicosta (Von Koenen, 1892) (Junior synonym)

= Zebinella cochlearina =

Species of gastropod

Zebinella cochlearina is an extinct species of minute sea snail, a marine gastropod mollusk or micromollusk in the family Rissoinidae.

== Distribution ==
Fossils of this marine species were found in Oligocene strata in Île-de-France, France.
