= Zebinella varicosa =

Scientific classification
- Kingdom: Animalia
- Phylum: Mollusca
- Class: Gastropoda
- Subclass: Caenogastropoda
- Order: Littorinimorpha
- Superfamily: Rissooidea
- Family: Rissoinidae
- Genus: Zebinella
- Species: †Z. varicosa

Binomial name
- †Zebinella varicosa O. Boettger, 1907

Synonyms
- † Rissoina (Zebinella) varicosa O. Boettger, 1907; † Rissoina (Zebinella) sororcula var. varicosa Boettger, 1901; † Rissoina varicosa O. Boettger, 1907

Species of gastropod

Zebinella varicosa is an extinct species of minute sea snail, a marine gastropod mollusk or micromollusk in the family Rissoinidae.

== Description ==
The length of the shell attains 5 mm, its diameter 2 mm.

== Distribution ==
Fossils of this species were found in Lower Miocene strata in Central Europe.
