= Zebinella striosa =

Scientific classification
- Kingdom: Animalia
- Phylum: Mollusca
- Class: Gastropoda
- Subclass: Caenogastropoda
- Order: Littorinimorpha
- Family: Rissoinidae
- Genus: Zebinella
- Species: Z. striosa

Binomial name
- Zebinella striosa (C. B. Adams, 1850)

Synonyms
- Monostigma striosum (C. B. Adams, 1850); Rissoa striosa C. B. Adams, 1850; Rissoina striosa (C. B. Adams, 1850)

Species of gastropod

Zebinella striosa is a species of small sea snail, a marine gastropod mollusk or micromollusk in the family Rissoinidae.

== Distribution ==
This species occurs in the Gulf of Mexico, the Caribbean Sea and the Lesser Antilles; in the Atlantic Ocean off Northern Brazil.

== Description ==
The maximum recorded shell length is 8 mm.

(Described as Rissoa striosa) The ovate shell is conic and somewhat turrited. It is dingy white or corneous. On each whorl there are twenty-five to twenty-eight moderately developed transverse folds, which are obsolete on the lower part of the middle whorls and on most of the last whorls. There are very numerous crowded deeply impressed spiral striae. The infrasutural impressed line is larger than the striae and constricts the whorls. The apex is acute. The outlines of the spire are moderately curvilinear. The shell contains nine whorls, rather convex, with a moderately impressed suture. The large aperture is somewhat effuse. The outer lip is well advanced, much excurved and moderately thickened.

== Habitat ==
Minimum recorded depth is 0 m. Maximum recorded depth is 1 m.
