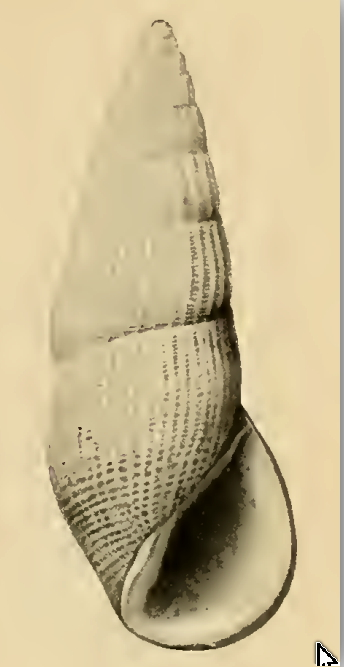
- Shell of Zebinella townsendi (holotype)

Scientific classification
- Kingdom: Animalia
- Phylum: Mollusca
- Class: Gastropoda
- Subclass: Caenogastropoda
- Order: Littorinimorpha
- Superfamily: Rissooidea
- Family: Rissoinidae
- Genus: Zebinella
- Species: Z. townsendi

Binomial name
- Zebinella townsendi (Bartsch, 1915)

Synonyms
- Rissoina townsendi Bartsch, 1915 ·

= Zebinella townsendi =

Species of gastropod

Zebinella townsendi is a species of small sea snail, a marine gastropod mollusk or micromollusk in the family Rissoinidae.

== Description ==
The length of the shell attains 5.3 mm, its diameter 2.4 mm.

(Original description) The bluish white shell is of medium size and elongate conic. The protoconch consists of 3½ whorls, well rounded, smooth and shining. The postnuclear whorls are appressed at the summit and moderately rounded. They are marked by strong, well-rounded, slightly protractive, axial ribs, of which 16 occur upon the first, 18 upon the second, 24 upon the third, 26 upon the fourth, 38 upon the fifth, and 52 upon the body whorl.

The intercostal spaces on the first 3 whorls are a little more than twice as wide as the ribs, while on the next 2 they are about double as wide. On the body whorl, however, they are only about one and one-half times as broad as the ribs. In addition to the axial sculpture, the intercostal spaces are marked by well-incised spiral lines, of which about 22 occur on the penultimate turn. The sutures are slightly impressed.

The base of the shell is somewhat produced, marked by the continuation of the axial ribs which extend to the umbilical chink, and by 13 well-rounded, somewhat irregularly spaced, spiral cords which are not quite as wide as the spaces that separate them. The aperture is auricular. The outer lip is slightly channeled at the posterior angle and at the junction of the outer and basal lip. The outer lip is reinforced by a thick callus immediately behind the edge. The columella is short, stout, twisted and reflected over and appressed to the base. The parietal wall is covered with a thick callus which renders the peritreme complete.

== Distribution ==
This marine species occurs in the Pacific Ocean off Lower California.
