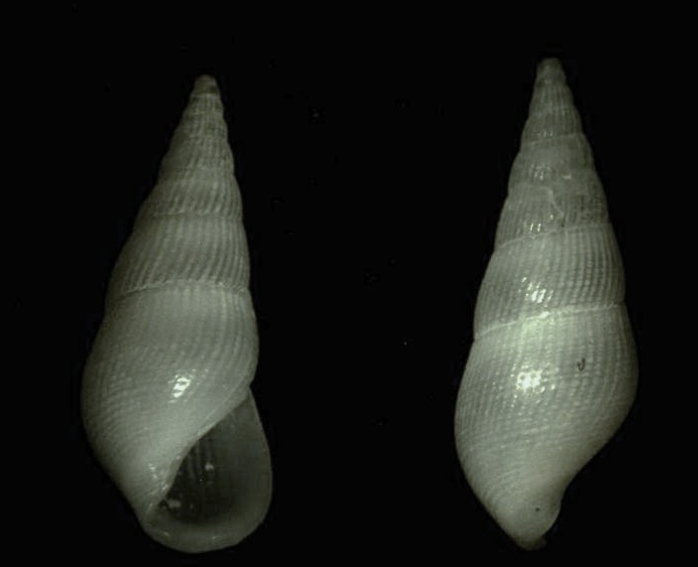
- Shell of Zebinella elegantula

Scientific classification
- Kingdom: Animalia
- Phylum: Mollusca
- Class: Gastropoda
- Subclass: Caenogastropoda
- Order: Littorinimorpha
- Superfamily: Rissooidea
- Family: Rissoinidae
- Genus: Zebinella
- Species: Z. elegantula

Binomial name
- Zebinella elegantula (Angas, 1880)

Synonyms
- Peripetella elegantula (Angas, 1880).; Rissoina elegantula Angas, 1880 ·; Rissoina (Rissoina) elegantula Angas, 1880

= Zebinella elegantula =

Species of gastropod

Zebinella elegantula is a species of small sea snail, a marine gastropod mollusk or micromollusk in the family Rissoinidae.

== Description ==
The length of the shell attains 7 mm.

(Original description) The white shell is elongately pyramidal and moderately solid. The shell consists of eight whorls, slightly convex, longitudinally, closely and regularly finely plicate. The interstices (especially on the body whorl) are crossed by fine lirae. The sutures are distinct. The aperture is subovate. The outer lip is thickened and slightly sinuous at the base of the columella.

== Distribution ==
This marine species is endemic to Australia and occurs off New South Wales, South Australia, Tasmania, Victoria and Western Australia
