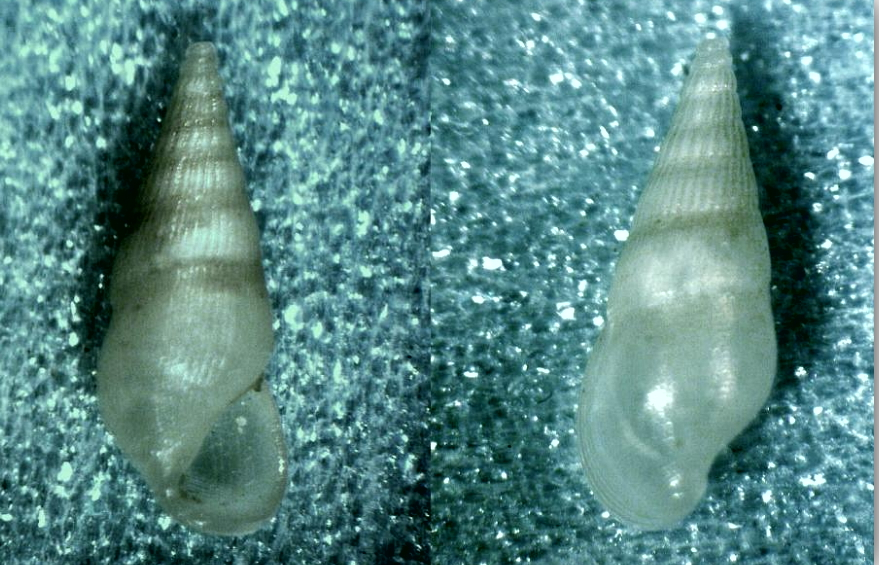
- Shell of Zebinella princeps

Scientific classification
- Kingdom: Animalia
- Phylum: Mollusca
- Class: Gastropoda
- Subclass: Caenogastropoda
- Order: Littorinimorpha
- Family: Rissoinidae
- Genus: Zebinella
- Species: Z. princeps

Binomial name
- Zebinella princeps (C. B. Adams, 1850)

Synonyms
- Rissoa princeps C. B. Adams, 1850 (original description); Rissoina princeps (C. B. Adams, 1850)

= Zebinella princeps =

Species of gastropod

Zebinella princeps is a species of small sea snail, a marine gastropod mollusk or micromollusk in the family Rissoinidae.

== Distribution ==
This species occurs in the Gulf of Mexico, the Caribbean Sea and the Lesser Antilles; in the Atlantic Ocean off Northern Brazil.

== Description ==
The maximum recorded shell length is 15 mm.

(Original description) The white, ovate conic shell is turrited. It is composed of very numerous crowded slender ribs, which become obsolete on the body whorl, and strong crowded spiral striae, which become larger on the body whorl. The apex is acute. The spire shows rectilinear outlines. It contains ten whorls, nearly planulate, slightly contracted next below the suture, which is moderately impressed. The aperture is very effuse. The outer lip is very much advanced a little below the middle, well excurved, moderately thickened.

== Habitat ==
Minimum recorded depth is 0 m. Maximum recorded depth is 86 m.
