= Zebinella albida =

Scientific classification
- Kingdom: Animalia
- Phylum: Mollusca
- Class: Gastropoda
- Subclass: Caenogastropoda
- Order: Littorinimorpha
- Superfamily: Rissooidea
- Family: Rissoinidae
- Genus: Zebinella
- Species: Z. albida

Binomial name
- Zebinella albida (C. B. Adams, 1845)

Synonyms
- Rissoa albida C. B. Adams, 1845 (original combination)

Species of gastropod

Zebinella albida is a species of minute sea snail, a marine gastropod mollusk or micromollusk in the family Rissoinidae.

== Description ==
(Original description in Latin) The large white shell is transparent. The protoconch is very sharp. The shell contains 10 whorls. The sculpture shows several very slender ribs, worn to the lower part of each, and running down with very slender striations, neatly cut off. There are deeper striations near the suture. The aperture is narrow. The outer lip is separated from the lip above the sinus.

== Distribution ==
This marine species occurs off Jamaica, Caribbean Sea.
