= Rissoina tenuistriata =

Scientific classification
- Kingdom: Animalia
- Phylum: Mollusca
- Class: Gastropoda
- Subclass: Caenogastropoda
- Order: Littorinimorpha
- Family: Rissoinidae
- Genus: Rissoina
- Species: R. tenuistriata

Binomial name
- Rissoina tenuistriata Pease

Species of gastropod

Rissoina tenuistriata is a species of minute sea snail, a marine gastropod mollusk or micromollusk in the family Rissoinidae.

== Distribution ==
This species occurs in the Indian Ocean off the Aldabra Atoll.
