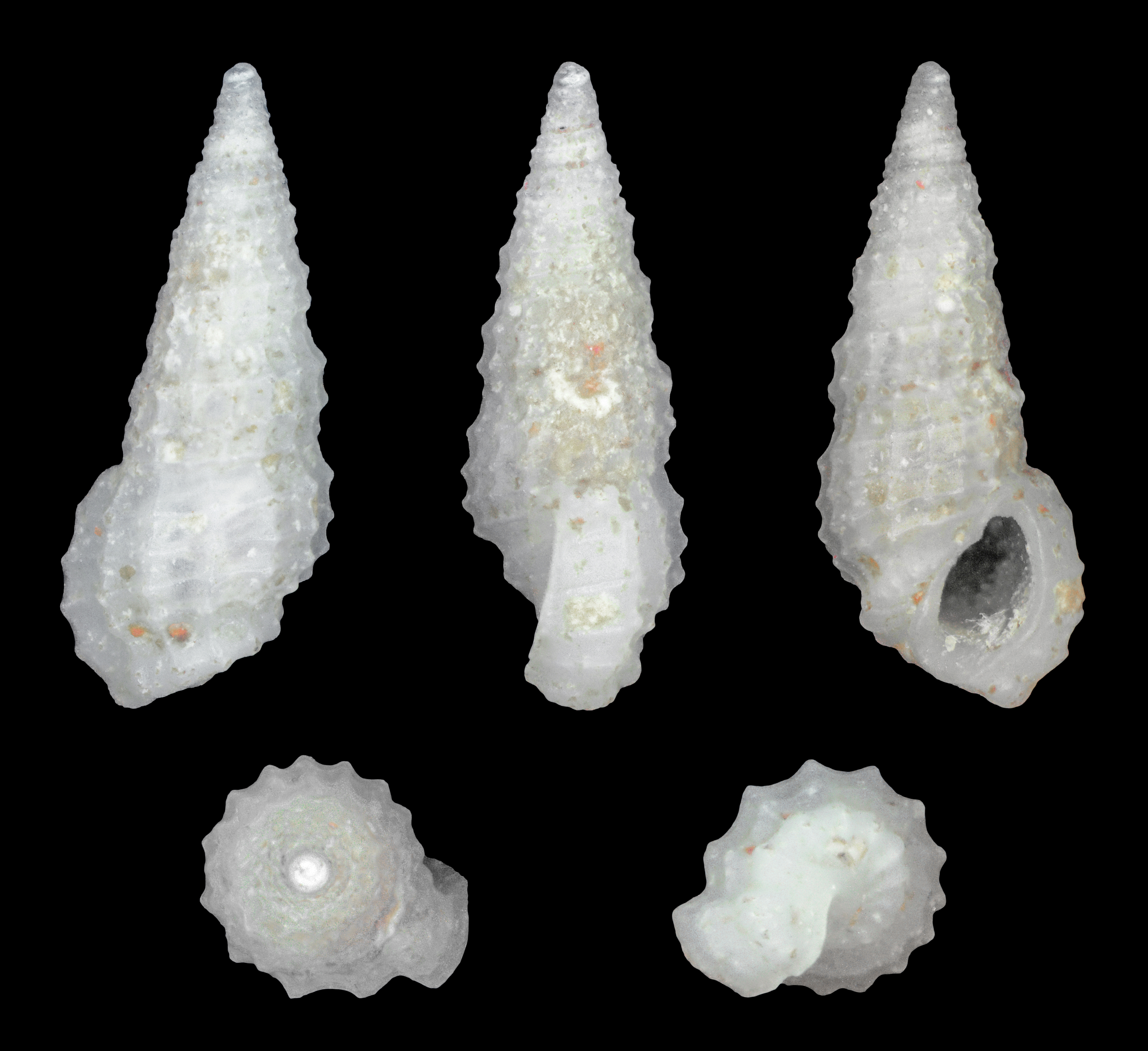
- Phosinella dunkeriana

Scientific classification
- Kingdom: Animalia
- Phylum: Mollusca
- Class: Gastropoda
- Subclass: Caenogastropoda
- Order: Littorinimorpha
- Superfamily: Rissooidea
- Family: Rissoinidae
- Genus: Phosinella; Mörch, 1876

Type species
- Rissoina pulchra (C. B. Adams, 1850)

Synonyms
- Phintorene Iredale, 1955; Planapexia Laseron, 1956; Rissoina (Phosinella) Mörch, 1876

= Phosinella =

Genus of gastropods

Phosinella is a genus of minute sea snails, marine gastropod mollusks or micromollusks, in the family Rissoinidae.

== Species ==
Species within the genus Phosinella include:

- † Phosinella alexisi (Ladd, 1966)
- Phosinella allanae (Laseron, 1950)
- Phosinella angusta (Laseron, 1956)
- Phosinella apicina (Laseron, 1956)
- † Phosinella awana (Yokoyama, 1924)
- Phosinella bellula (A. Adams, 1851)
- † Phosinella briggsi (Ladd, 1966)
- Phosinella caelata (Laseron, 1956)
- Phosinella cancellata (Philippi, 1847)
- Phosinella cancellina (Rolán & Fernández-Garcés, 2010)
- Phosinella cartieri (Hornung & Mermod, 1929)
- Phosinella clathrata (A. Adams, 1853)
- † Phosinella collinsii (Gabb, 1881)
- Phosinella cyatha (Laseron, 1956)
- Phosinella decepta (Laseron, 1956)
- Phosinella digera (Laseron, 1956)
- Phosinella dunkeriana Kuroda & Habe in Habe, 1961
- Phosinella elevata (Laseron, 1956)
- Phosinella emina (Laseron, 1956)
- Phosinella exasperata (Souverbie, 1866)
- † Phosinella fargoi (Olsson & Harbison, 1953)
- Phosinella fenestrata (Schwartz von Mohrenstern, 1860)
- Phosinella hungerfordiana (Weinkauff, 1881)
- Phosinella hystrix (Souverbie, 1877)
- Phosinella infratincta (Garrett, 1873)
- Phosinella media (Schwartz, 1860)
- Phosinella nitida (A. Adams, 1853)
- Phosinella nodicincta (A. Adams, 1853)
- † Phosinella oncera (Woodring, 1957)
- Phosinella paenula (Laseron, 1956)
- Phosinella phormis (Melvill, 1904)
- Phosinella privati (de Folin, 1867)
- Phosinella proxima (Laseron, 1956)
- Phosinella pulchra (C. B. Adams, 1850)
- Phosinella redferni (Espinosa & Ortea, 2002)
- Phosinella retecosa (Thiele, 1925)
- Phosinella sagraiana (d'Orbigny, 1842)
- Phosinella scabra (Garrett, 1873)
- Phosinella schmackeri (Boettger, 1887)
- Phosinella seguenziana (Issel, 1869)
- Phosinella sincera (Melvill & Standen, 1896)
- Phosinella spinulosa Paulmier, 2017
- Phosinella sumatrensis (Thiele, 1925)
- Phosinella teres (Brazier, 1877)
- Phosinella ultima (Laseron, 1956)
- Phosinella warnefordiae (Preston, 1908)

Species brought into synonymy

- Phosinella castaneogramma [sic]: synonym of Rissoina costatogranosa Garrett, 1873 (based on a lapsus)
- Phosinella conifera (Montagu, 1803): synonym of Rissoina conifera (Montagu, 1803) (Not a Phosinella)
- Phosinella costatogranosa (Garrett, 1873): synonym of Rissoina costatogranosa Garrett, 1873
- Phosinella deshayesiana (Récluz, 1843):synonym of Rissoa deshayesiana Récluz, 1843 synonym of Chrysallida excavata (Philippi, 1836): synonym of Folinella excavata (Phillippi, 1836)
- Phosinella fractura (Laseron, 1956): synonym of Phosinella media (Schwartz von Mohrenstern, 1860) (junior synonym)
- Phosinella gemmea (Hedley, 1899): synonym of Rissoina gemmea Hedley, 1899
- Phosinella pura (Gould, 1861): synonym of Phosinella media (Schwartz von Mohrenstern, 1860) (junior synonym)
- Phosinella scabra [sic]: synonym of Phosinella scaba (Garrett, 1873) (misspelling)
