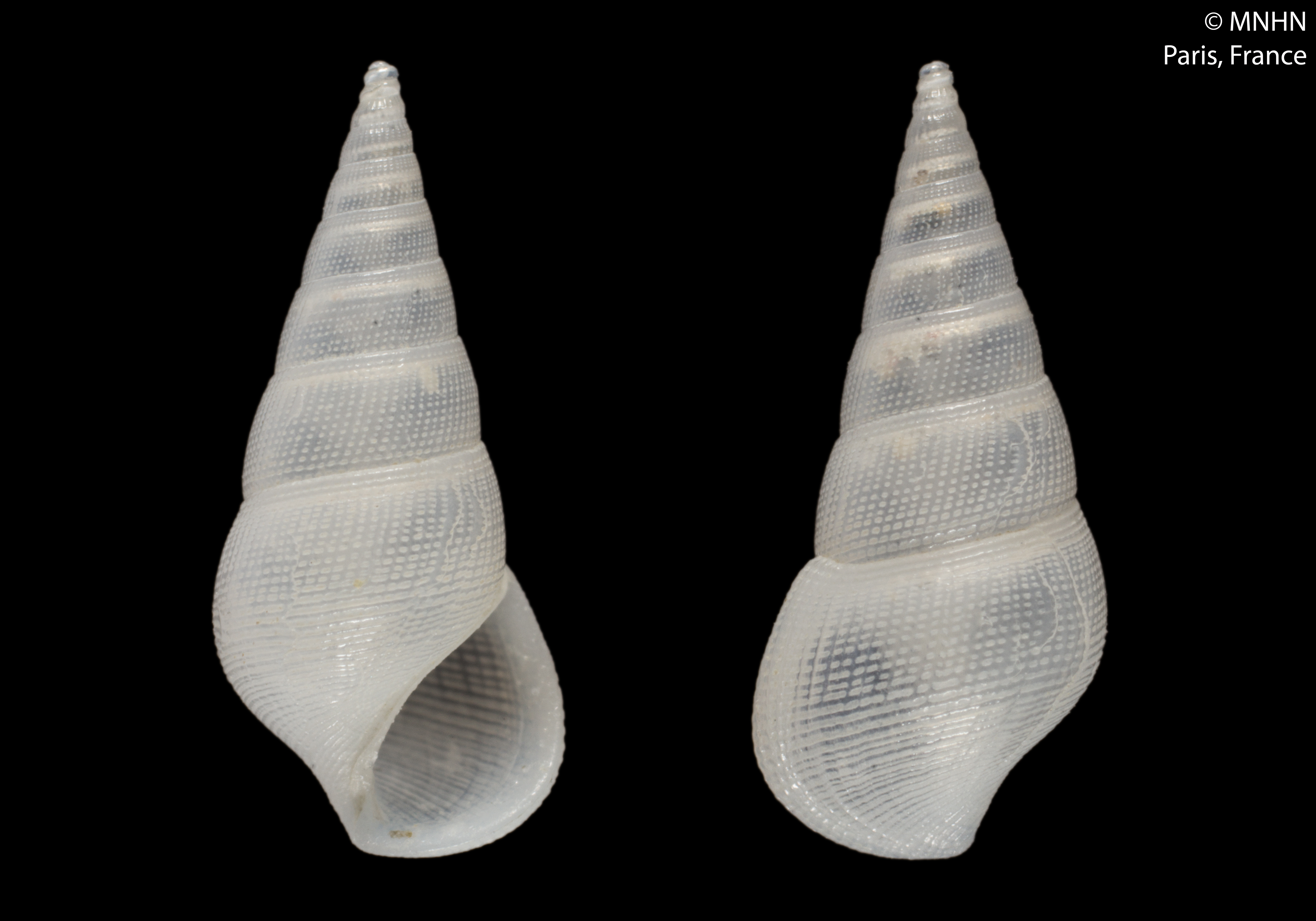
- Shell of Chiliostigma tumida (holotype at MNHN, Paris)

Scientific classification
- Kingdom: Animalia
- Phylum: Mollusca
- Class: Gastropoda
- Subclass: Caenogastropoda
- Order: Littorinimorpha
- Superfamily: Rissooidea
- Family: Rissoinidae
- Genus: Chiliostigma; Melvill, 1918

Type species
- Rissoina refugium Melvill, 1918

Synonyms
- Rissoina (Chiliostigma) Melvill, 1918

= Chiliostigma =

Genus of gastropods

Chiliostigma is a small genus of minute sea snails, marine gastropod mollusks or micromollusks, in the family Rissoinidae.

== Species ==
- Chiliostigma refugium (Melvill, 1918)
- Chiliostigma tumida Faber & Moolenbeek, 2014
