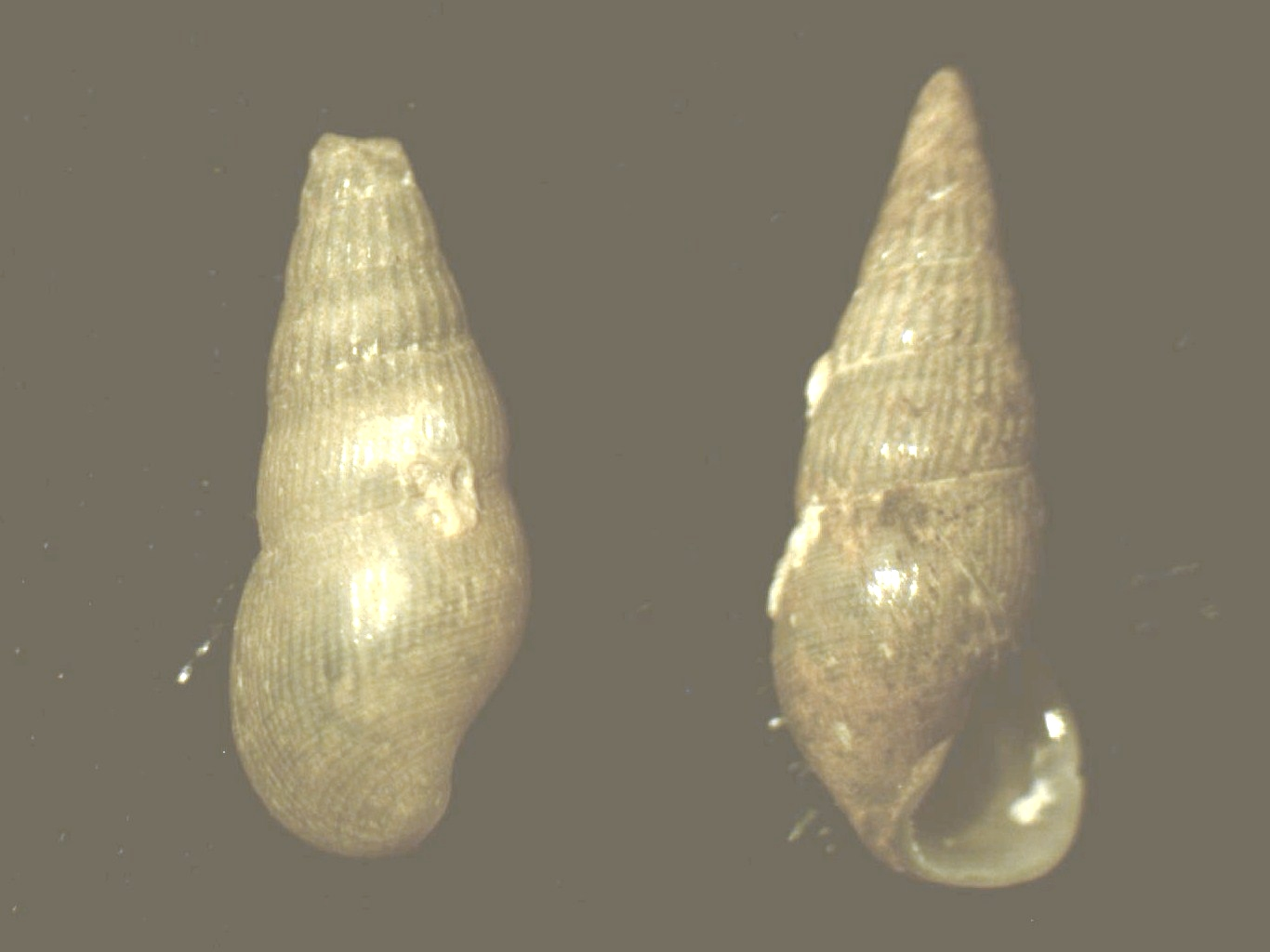
- Two views of a shell of Zebinella decussata

Scientific classification
- Kingdom: Animalia
- Phylum: Mollusca
- Class: Gastropoda
- Subclass: Caenogastropoda
- Order: Littorinimorpha
- Family: Rissoinidae
- Genus: Zebinella
- Species: Z. decussata

Binomial name
- Zebinella decussata (Montagu, 1803)

Synonyms
- Helix decussata Montagu, 1803 (original description); Rissoa decussata Montagu, 1803; Rissoa albida C. B. Adams, 1845; Rissoina decussata (Montagu, 1803); Zebinella decussata var. percosticillatina Sacco, 1895; Zebinella decussata var. raricostulata Sacco, 1895; Zebinella decussata var. turritopaucicosta Sacco, 1895 ·

= Zebinella decussata =

Species of gastropod

Zebinella decussata is a species of small sea snail, a marine gastropod mollusk or micromollusk in the family Rissoinidae.

== Distribution ==
This species occurs in the Caribbean Sea, the Gulf of Mexico and the Lesser Antilles.

== Description ==
The maximum recorded shell length is 9.7 mm.

== Habitat ==
Minimum recorded depth is 0 m. Maximum recorded depth is 106 m.
