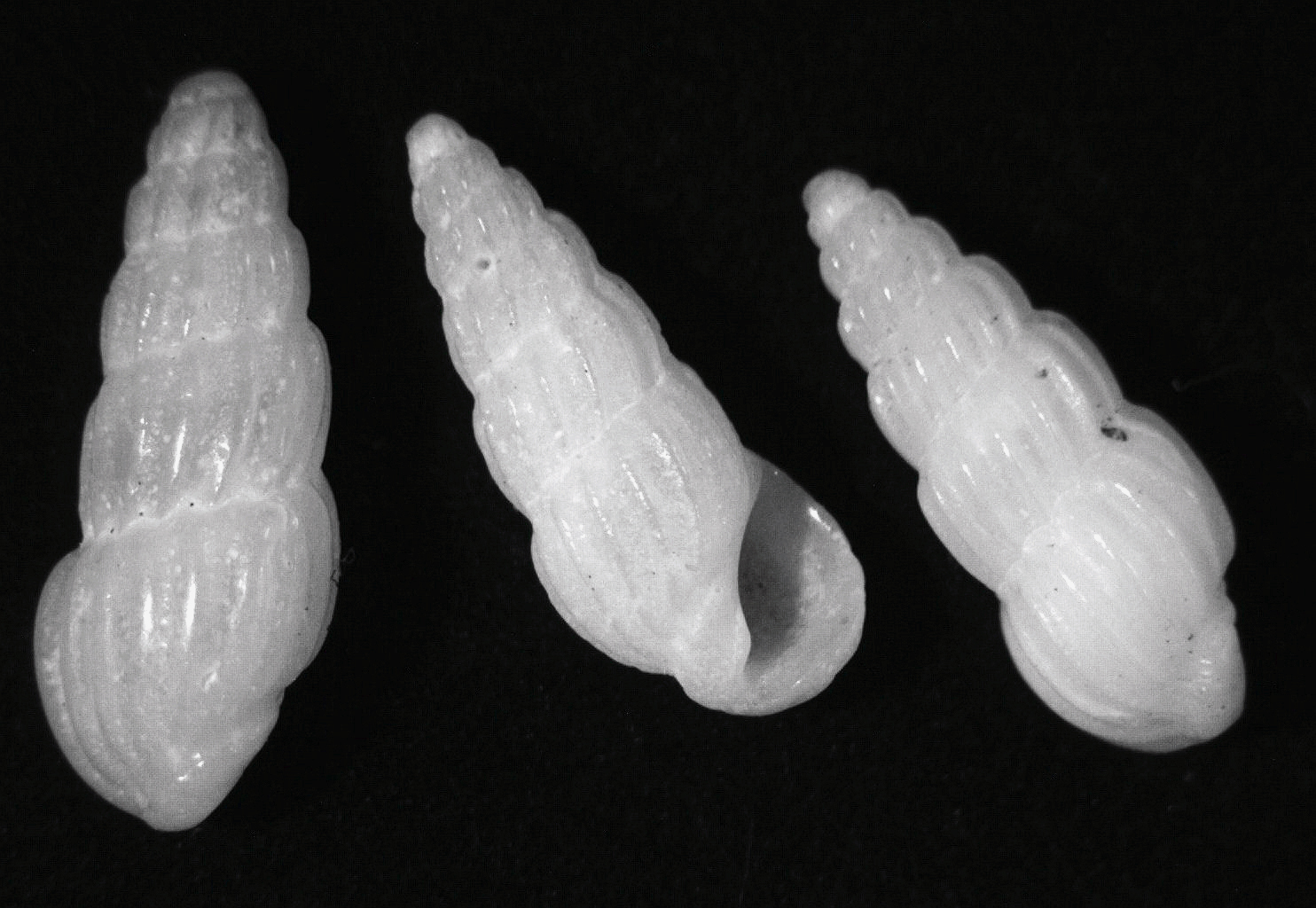
- Three worn shells of Rissoina crassa

Scientific classification
- Kingdom: Animalia
- Phylum: Mollusca
- Class: Gastropoda
- Subclass: Caenogastropoda
- Order: Littorinimorpha
- Superfamily: Rissooidea
- Family: Rissoinidae; Stimpson, 1865

Genera
- See text

Synonyms
- Phosinellinae Coan, 1964 (junior synonym); Rissoininae Stimpson, 1865; Rissoinoidea Stimpson, 1865; Rissolinidae Voorwinde, 1966 (Based on Rissolina Gould, 1861, a junior synonym of Rissoina d'Orbigny, 1840)

= Rissoinidae =

Family of gastropods

Rissoinidae is a large family of sea snails. Members of the Rissoinidae have an operculum and are very small in size. Several genera that were previously part of Rissoinidae have been assigned to the Zebinidae family.

== Genera ==
Genera within the family Rissoinidae include:

- Ailinzebina Ladd, 1966
- Anteglosia H.E. Vokes, 1948†
- Apataxia Laseron, 1956
- Bralitzia Gründel, 1998†
- Buvignieria Cossmann, 1921†
- Chiliostigma Melvill, 1918
- Hudlestoniella Cossmann, 1909†
- Lamellirissoina Kuroda & Habe, 1991
- Leaella Cossmann, 1921†
- Moerchiella G. Nevill, 1885
- Ottoina Harris & Palmer, 1947†
- Parazebinella Boettger, 1893
- Phosinella Mörch, 1876
- Rissoina d'Orbigny, 1840
- Rissoinella Oyama in Taki & Oyama, 1954
- Sulcorissoina Kosuge, 1965
- Zebinella Mörch, 1876
- Zebinostoma Conti & Fischer, 1982†

Genera brought into synonymy

- Austrosina Laseron, 1956: synonym of Rissoina d'Orbigny, 1840
- Caporista Iredale, 1955: synonym of Rissoina d'Orbigny, 1840
- Condylicia Laseron, 1956: synonym of Rissoina d'Orbigny, 1840
- Costalynia Laseron, 1956: synonym of Rissoina (Rissolina) Gould, 1861 represented as Rissoina d'Orbigny, 1840
- Dentrissoina Laseron, 1956: synonym of Tomlinella Viader, 1938
- Fractoralla Laseron, 1956: synonym of Rissoina (Rissolina) Gould, 1861 represented as Rissoina d'Orbigny, 1840
- Laseronia Cotton, 1959: synonym of Rissoina d'Orbigny, 1840
- Peripetella Laseron, 1956: synonym of Rissoina d'Orbigny, 1840
- Phintorene Iredale, 1955: synonym of Phosinella Mörch, 1876
- Planapexia Laseron, 1956: synonym of Phosinella Mörch, 1876
- Pleneconea Laseron, 1956: synonym of Rissoina d'Orbigny, 1840
- Rissolina Gould, 1861: synonym of Rissoina (Rissolina) Gould, 1861 represented as Rissoina d'Orbigny, 1840
- Stiva Hedley, 1904: synonym of Rissoina d'Orbigny, 1840
- Zymalata Laseron, 1956: synonym of Rissoina d'Orbigny, 1840
