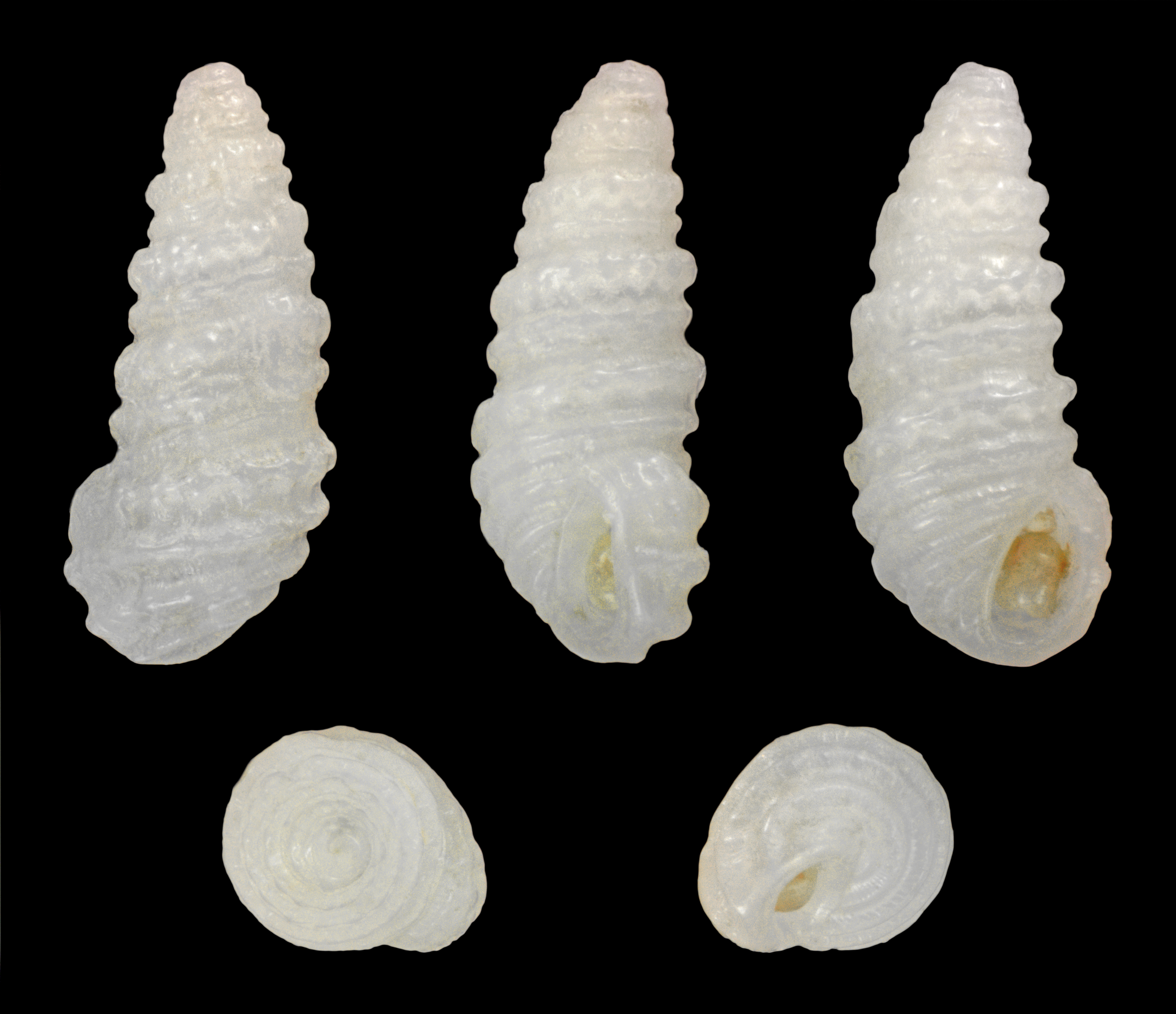
- Shell of Pyramidelloides mirandus

Scientific classification
- Kingdom: Animalia
- Phylum: Mollusca
- Class: Gastropoda
- Subclass: Caenogastropoda
- Order: Littorinimorpha
- Superfamily: Vanikoroidea
- Family: Eulimidae
- Genus: Pyramidelloides; G. Nevill, 1885

Type species
- Rissoa miranda A. Adams, 1861

Synonyms
- Pyramidelloides (Teretianax) Iredale, 1918 - alternate representation; Rissoina (Pyramidelloides) G. Nevill, 1885

= Pyramidelloides =

Genus of gastropods

Pyramidelloides is a genus of minute, ectoparasitic sea snails, marine gastropod mollusks or micromollusks in the family Eulimidae.

== Species ==
Species within the genus Pyramidelloides include:

- Pyramidelloides angulatus (Jickeli, 1882)
- Pyramidelloides angustus (Hedley, 1898)
- Pyramidelloides barbadensis Moolenbeek & Faber, 1992
- Pyramidelloides carinatus (Mörch, 1876)
- Pyramidelloides glaber Faber, 1990
- Pyramidelloides gracilis (Garrett, 1873)
- Pyramidelloides mirandus (A. Adams, 1861)
- Pyramidelloides multicostatus Faber, 1990
- Pyramidelloides tosaensis Habe, 1961

Species brought into synonymy

- Pyramidelloides baculumpastoris (Melvill & Standen, 1896): synonym of Teretianax baculumpastoris (Melvill & Standen, 1896)
- Pyramidelloides cylindrica Laseron, 1956: synonym of Pyramidelloides mirandus (A. Adams, 1861)
- Pyramidelloides letsonae (Pilsbry, 1918): synonym of Chrystella suta (Pilsbry, 1918)
- Pyramidelloides minutus (Turton, 1932): synonym of Teretianax minuta (W. H. Turton, 1932)
- Pyramidelloides pacifica Laseron, 1956: synonym of Pyramidelloides mirandus (A. Adams, 1861)
- Pyramidelloides pagoda (Powell, 1926): synonym of Teretianax pagoda Powell, 1926
- Pyramidelloides suta (Pilsbry, 1918): synonym of Chrystella suta (Pilsbry, 1918)
- Pyramidelloides suteri (Oliver, 1915): synonym of Teretianax suteri (W. R. B. Oliver, 1915)
- Pyramidelloides triliratus (de Folin, 1873): synonym of Teretianax trilirata (de Folin, 1873)
- Pyramidelloides turris Laseron, 1956: synonym of Pyramidelloides mirandus (A. Adams, 1861)
- Pyramidelloides viticula Laseron, 1956: synonym of Pandalosia viticula (Laseron, 1956) (original combination)
