= Pyramidelloides angustus =

Scientific classification
- Kingdom: Animalia
- Phylum: Mollusca
- Class: Gastropoda
- Subclass: Caenogastropoda
- Order: Littorinimorpha
- Family: Eulimidae
- Genus: Pyramidelloides
- Species: P. angustus

Binomial name
- Pyramidelloides angustus (Hedley, 1898)

Synonyms
- Rissoa gracilis Pease, 1860 (Invalid: junior homonym of Rissoa gracilis Macgillivray, 1843 and several others); Rissoina angusta Hedley, 1898 (original combination); Rissoina viaderi Tomlin, 1939

Species of gastropod

Pyramidelloides angustus is a species of sea snail, a marine gastropod mollusk in the family Eulimidae. The species is one of a number within the genus Pyramidelloides.
