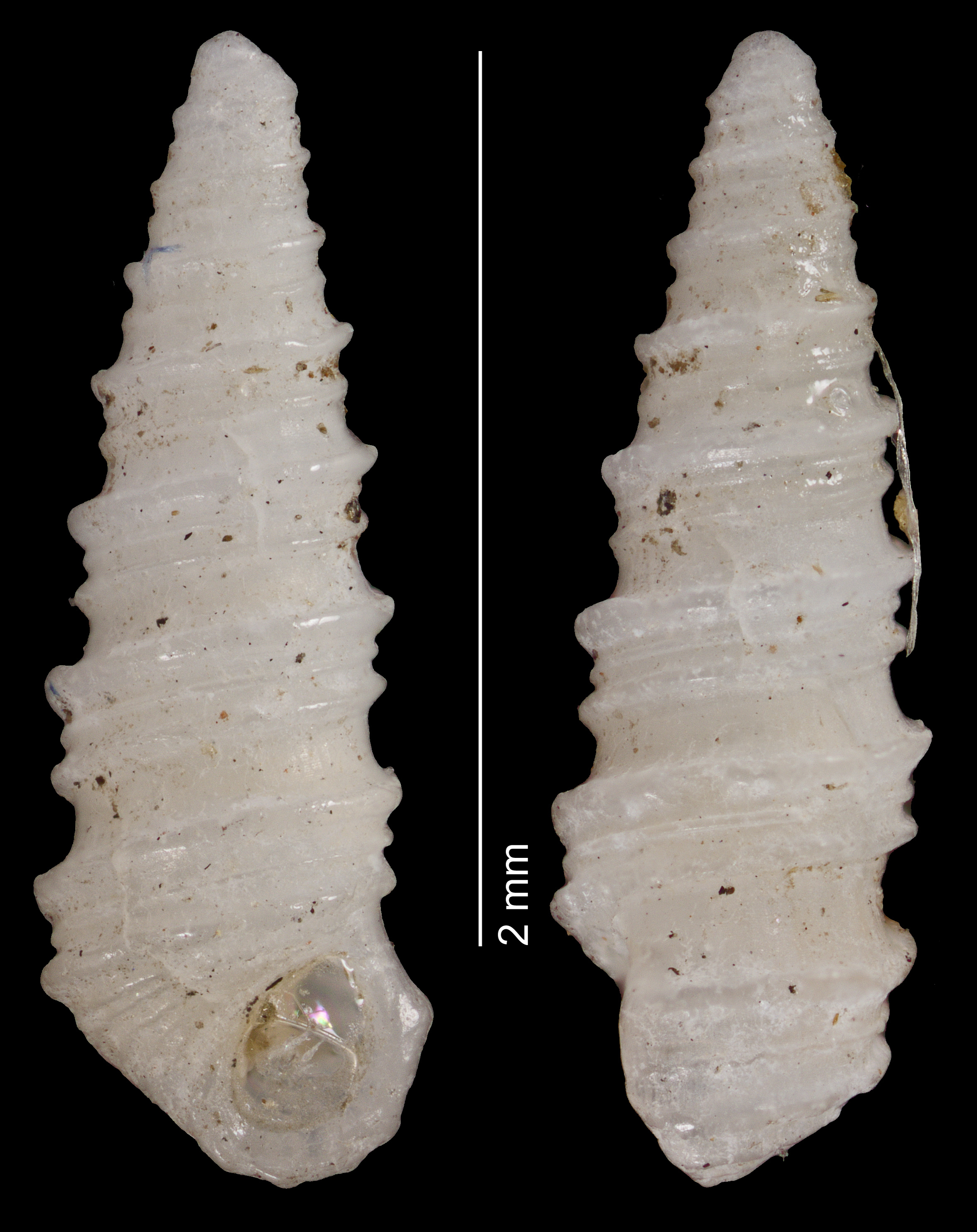
- Shell of Teretianax trilirata (syntype at MNHN, Paris)

Scientific classification
- Kingdom: Animalia
- Phylum: Mollusca
- Class: Gastropoda
- Subclass: Caenogastropoda
- Order: Littorinimorpha
- Superfamily: Vanikoroidea
- Family: Eulimidae
- Genus: Teretianax; Iredale, 1918

Type species
- Scalenostoma suteri W. R. B. Oliver, 1915

Synonyms
- Pyramidelloides (Teretianax) Iredale, 1918; Teretinax [sic] (misspelling for Teretianax)

= Teretianax =

Genus of gastropods

Teretianax is a genus of minute sea snails, marine gastropod mollusks in the family Eulimidae.

== Species ==
- Teretianax baculumpastoris (Melvill & Standen, 1896)
- Teretianax minuta (W. H. Turton, 1932)
- Teretianax pagoda Powell, 1926
- Teretianax suteri (W. R. B. Oliver, 1915)
- Teretianax trilirata (de Folin, 1873)

Synonyms

- Teretianax suta (Pilsbry, 1918): synonym of Chrystella suta (Pilsbry, 1918)
