= Pyramidelloides glaber =

Scientific classification
- Kingdom: Animalia
- Phylum: Mollusca
- Class: Gastropoda
- Subclass: Caenogastropoda
- Order: Littorinimorpha
- Family: Eulimidae
- Genus: Pyramidelloides
- Species: P. glaber

Binomial name
- Pyramidelloides glaber Faber, 1990

Species of gastropod

Pyramidelloides glaber is a species of sea snail, a marine gastropod mollusk in the family Eulimidae. The species is one of a number within the genus Pyramidelloides.

== Description ==
The maximum recorded shell length is 1.5 mm.

== Habitat ==
Minimum recorded depth is 25 m. Maximum recorded depth is 25 m.
