= Pyramidelloides barbadensis =

Scientific classification
- Kingdom: Animalia
- Phylum: Mollusca
- Class: Gastropoda
- Subclass: Caenogastropoda
- Order: Littorinimorpha
- Family: Eulimidae
- Genus: Pyramidelloides
- Species: P. barbadensis

Binomial name
- Pyramidelloides barbadensis Moolenbeek & Faber, 1992

Species of gastropod

Pyramidelloides barbadensis is a species of sea snail, a marine gastropod mollusk in the family Eulimidae. The species is one of a number within the genus Pyramidelloides.

== Description ==
The maximum recorded shell length is 1.1 mm.

== Habitat ==
Minimum recorded depth is 100 m. Maximum recorded depth is 216 m.

== Taxonomy ==
The species was first described by William H. Dall in 1889 from specimens collected in the Caribbean region, specifically near Barbados, which is reflected in its specific epithet "barbadensis".
