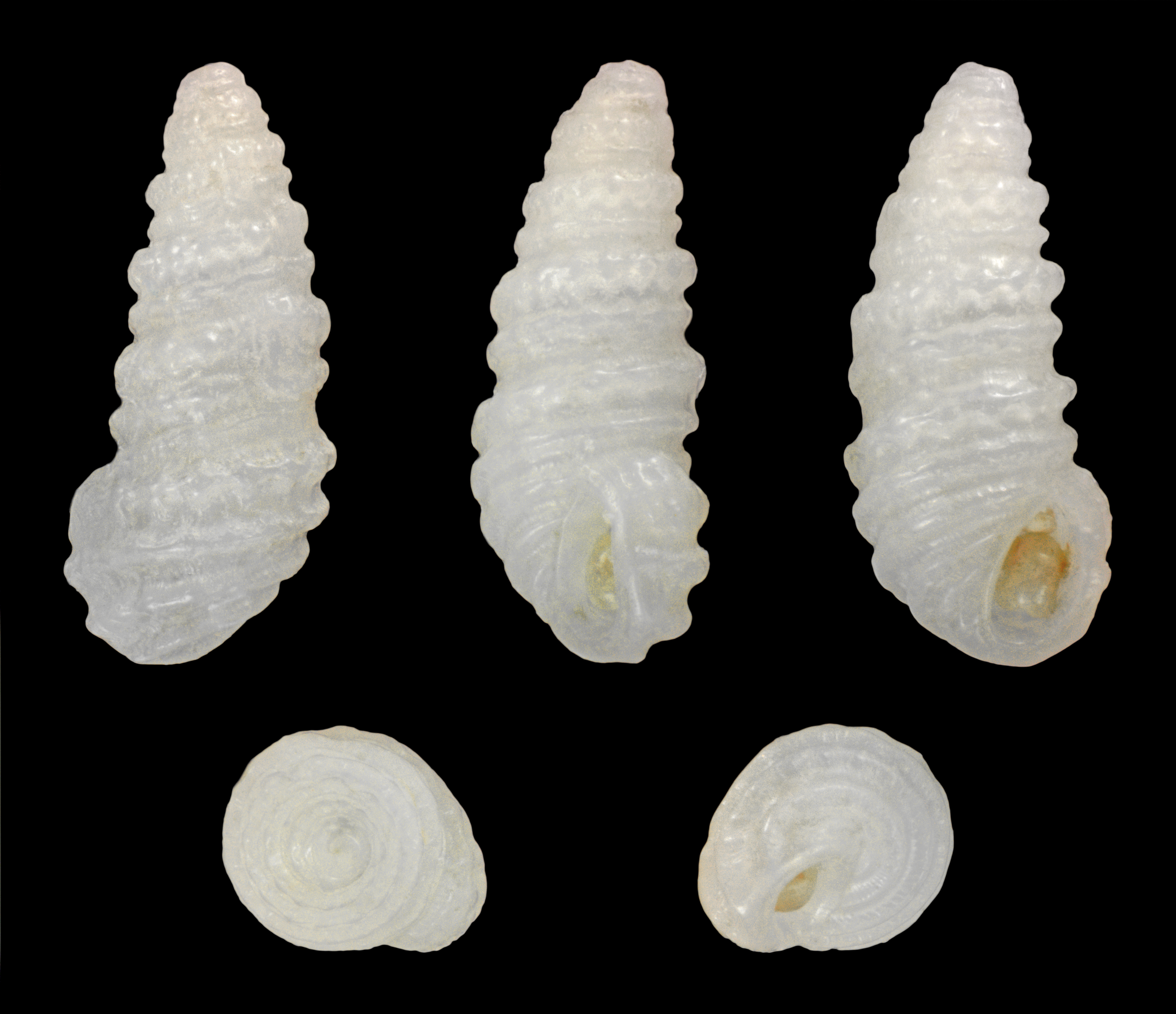
- Shell of Pyramidelloides mirandus

Scientific classification
- Kingdom: Animalia
- Phylum: Mollusca
- Class: Gastropoda
- Subclass: Caenogastropoda
- Order: Littorinimorpha
- Family: Eulimidae
- Genus: Pyramidelloides
- Species: P. mirandus

Binomial name
- Pyramidelloides mirandus (A. Adams, 1861)

Synonyms
- Pyramidelloides cylindrica Laseron, 1956; Pyramidelloides pacifica Laseron, 1956; Pyramidelloides turris Laseron, 1956; Rissoina (Pyramidelloides) insolita Deshayes, 1863; Rissoina (Pyramidelloides) insolita var. deformis G. Nevill, 1885; Rissoina (Pyramidelloides) insolita var. depauperata G. Nevill, 1885; Rissoina (Pyramidelloides) insolita var. major G. Nevill, 1885; Rissoina bellardii Issel, 1869; Rissoina eucosmia Bartsch, 1915; Rissoina gemmulata Turton, 1932; Rissoina hystrix Souverbie, 1877; Rissoina insolita Deshayes, 1863; Rissoina miranda A. Adams, 1861 (basionym)

= Pyramidelloides mirandus =

Species of gastropod

Pyramidelloides mirandus is a species of small sea snail, a marine gastropod mollusk or micromollusk in the family Eulimidae.

== Distribution ==
This marine species occurs in the Red Sea, the Indian Ocean, the Western Pacific; off Taiwan, Japan and Australia (Northern Territory, Queensland and Western Australia)
