= Pyramidelloides angulatus =

Scientific classification
- Kingdom: Animalia
- Phylum: Mollusca
- Class: Gastropoda
- Subclass: Caenogastropoda
- Order: Littorinimorpha
- Family: Eulimidae
- Genus: Pyramidelloides
- Species: P. angulatus

Binomial name
- Pyramidelloides angulatus (Jickeli, 1882)

Synonyms
- Rissoina angulata Jickeli, 1882

Species of gastropod

Pyramidelloides angulatus is a species of sea snail, a marine gastropod mollusk in the family Eulimidae. The species is one of a number within the genus Pyramidelloides.
