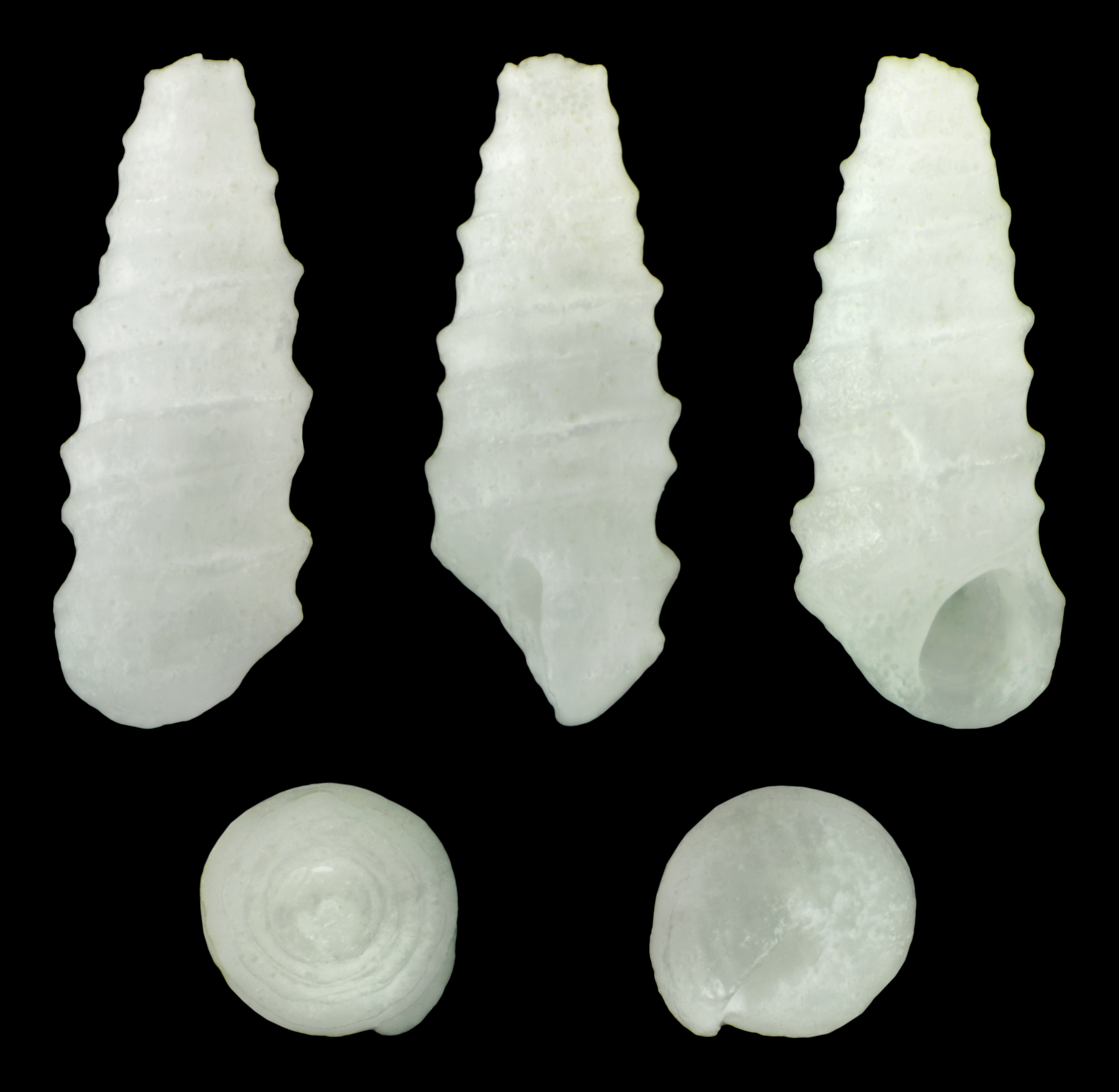
- Pyramidelloides carinatus, female

Scientific classification
- Kingdom: Animalia
- Phylum: Mollusca
- Class: Gastropoda
- Subclass: Caenogastropoda
- Order: Littorinimorpha
- Family: Eulimidae
- Genus: Pyramidelloides
- Species: P. carinatus

Binomial name
- Pyramidelloides carinatus (Mörch, 1876)

= Pyramidelloides carinatus =

Species of gastropod

Pyramidelloides carinatus is a species of sea snail, a marine gastropod mollusk in the family Eulimidae. The species is one of a number within the genus Pyramidelloides.

== Description ==
The maximum recorded shell length is 1.8 mm.

== Habitat ==
Minimum recorded depth is 0 m. Maximum recorded depth is 90 m.
