= Teretianax baculumpastoris =

Scientific classification
- Kingdom: Animalia
- Phylum: Mollusca
- Class: Gastropoda
- Subclass: Caenogastropoda
- Order: Littorinimorpha
- Family: Eulimidae
- Genus: Teretianax
- Species: T. baculumpastoris

Binomial name
- Teretianax baculumpastoris (Melvill & Standen, 1896)

Synonyms
- Pyramidelloides baculumpastoris (Melvill & Standen, 1896) ·; Rissoina baculumpastoris Melvill & Standen, 1896 (original combination)

Species of gastropod

Teretianax baculumpastoris is a species of sea snail, a marine gastropod mollusk in the family Eulimidae.

== Distribution ==
This marine species occurs off the Loyalty Islands.
