= Teretianax minuta =

Scientific classification
- Kingdom: Animalia
- Phylum: Mollusca
- Class: Gastropoda
- Subclass: Caenogastropoda
- Order: Littorinimorpha
- Family: Eulimidae
- Genus: Teretianax
- Species: T. minuta

Binomial name
- Teretianax minuta (Turton, 1932)

Synonyms
- Pyramidelloides minutus (W. H. Turton, 1932); Turritella minuta W. H. Turton, 1932 !junior homonym of Turritella minuta Koch & Dunker, 1837)

Species of gastropod

Teretianax minuta is a species of sea snail, a marine gastropod mollusk in the family Eulimidae.

== Distribution ==
This marine species occurs off Port Alfred, South Africa.
