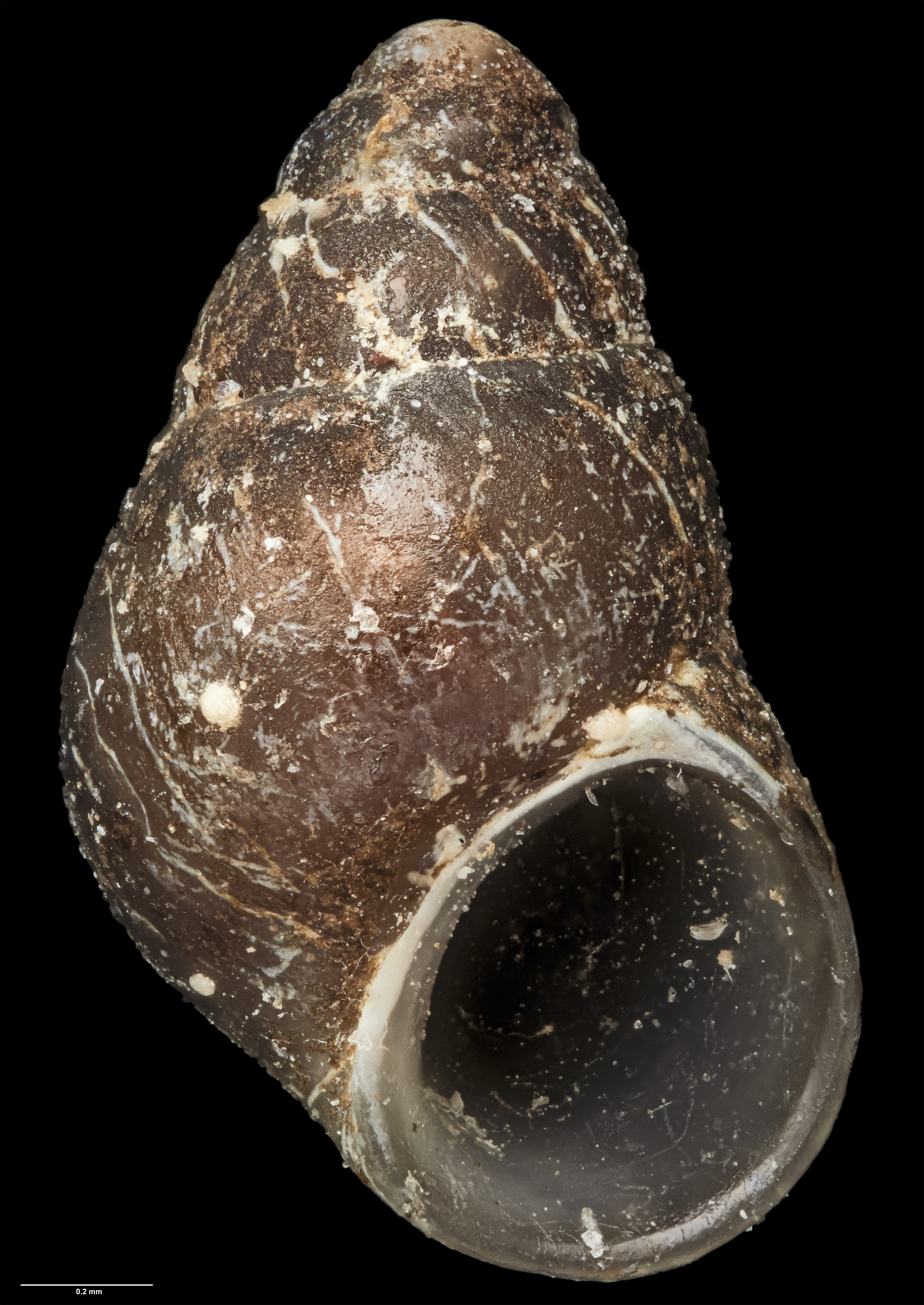
- Holotype of Eatoniella mortoni from Auckland War Memorial Museum

Scientific classification
- Kingdom: Animalia
- Phylum: Mollusca
- Class: Gastropoda
- Subclass: Caenogastropoda
- Order: Littorinimorpha
- Superfamily: Cingulopsoidea
- Family: Eatoniellidae
- Genus: Eatoniella
- Species: E. mortoni

Binomial name
- Eatoniella mortoni Ponder, 1965

Synonyms
- Eatoniella (Dardanula) mortoni Ponder 1965

= Eatoniella mortoni =

Species of gastropod

Eatoniella mortoni is a species of marine gastropod mollusc in the family Eatoniellidae. First described by Winston Ponder in 1965, it is endemic to the waters of New Zealand. The species has been used to study the effects of ocean acidification, as it is known to thrive in carbon dioxide-rich environments.

== Description ==
In the original description, Ponder described the species as follows:

Shell solid, of medium size for the subgenus [Dardanula], conical, smooth. Spire usually rather short, a little taller than height of aperture in the

holotype, but there is considerable variation. Whorls 4, lightly convex, fairly rapidly increasing; protoconch smooth, small, not marked off, body whorl large, but not swollen, periphery and base rounded. Aperture moderately large, approximately D-shaped in typical shells, but distinctly D-shaped in squat specimens, the anterior angulation typically indefinite; peristome continuous, thickened, inner lip broad, posterior part of outer lip especially heavy. Outer lip excavated strongly below. Colour variable, from dark grey, often with a purplish tint, to pale yellowish grey. Variation in shape is considerable, squat shells resembling E. (D.) dilatata (Powell), E. (D.) latebricola n. sp. and E. (D.) fuscosubucula n. sp. but can be separated on details of shape, colour and size. Tall shells resemble E. (D.) olivacea, but the new species can be distinguished by its rounded body whorl and apertural characters. Variation in the shell and the animal (see below) suggest that there may be more than one species included under this name.
Animal: (Leigh). Cephalic tentacles long, active, gradually tapering; eyes on outer bases of tentacles. Snout short, bilobed; buccal mass yellow to orange. Foot long, anterior mucous gland diffuse, posterior mucous gland large, dense white, opening into a slit extending from centre of sole to posterior end. Colour yellowish-white. Opercular lobe with no tentacle or group of mucous cells. (Island Bay) a short tentacle on left opercular lobe, and some black pigmentation on head and opercular lobes.
Operculum: (MacGregor's Bay). Oval, thick, strongly curved, peg broad, grooved. Muscle insertion area extensive, nearly opaque, pale brown on columella side, fading to yellowish near outer edge. Columella marginal area broad, yellowish transparent, outer marginal area similar but narrow. No internal ridge or thickening. Weak growth lines and fine spirals present.

Radula: Typical of the genus. Central large, 3 + 1 + 3, lateral with heavy basal processes, 2 + 1 + 2, inner marginal with 5 denticles and a cusp-like process on outer side just below the cutting edge. Outer marginal narrow, with a broad base and finely serrate.

E. mortoni measures 1.85 mm (0.073 in) by 1.13 mm (0.044 in). It can be identified due to its moderately large, D-shaped aperture, ovate-conical, smooth shell with a spire slightly taller than aperture, and by its colour, which varies between purple-tinted dark grey to pale yellowish-grey.

== Taxonomy ==
The species was first described by Winston Ponder in 1965, who named it Eatoniella (Dardanula) mortoni. Ponder named the species after New Zealand biologist John Morton, who had assisted Ponder during his early investigations into the species. Ponder synonymised several previously-named genera, including Iredale's 1915 genus Dardanula, which was retained as a subgenus of Eatoniella. The modern formatting of the name without a subgenus, Eatoniella mortoni, was established by Hamish Spencer and Richard C. Willan in 1995. The holotype of the species was collected by Ponder himself on 11 December 1961, from the south side of Days Bay in Lower Hutt. It is held by the Auckland War Memorial Museum.

== Distribution and habitat ==
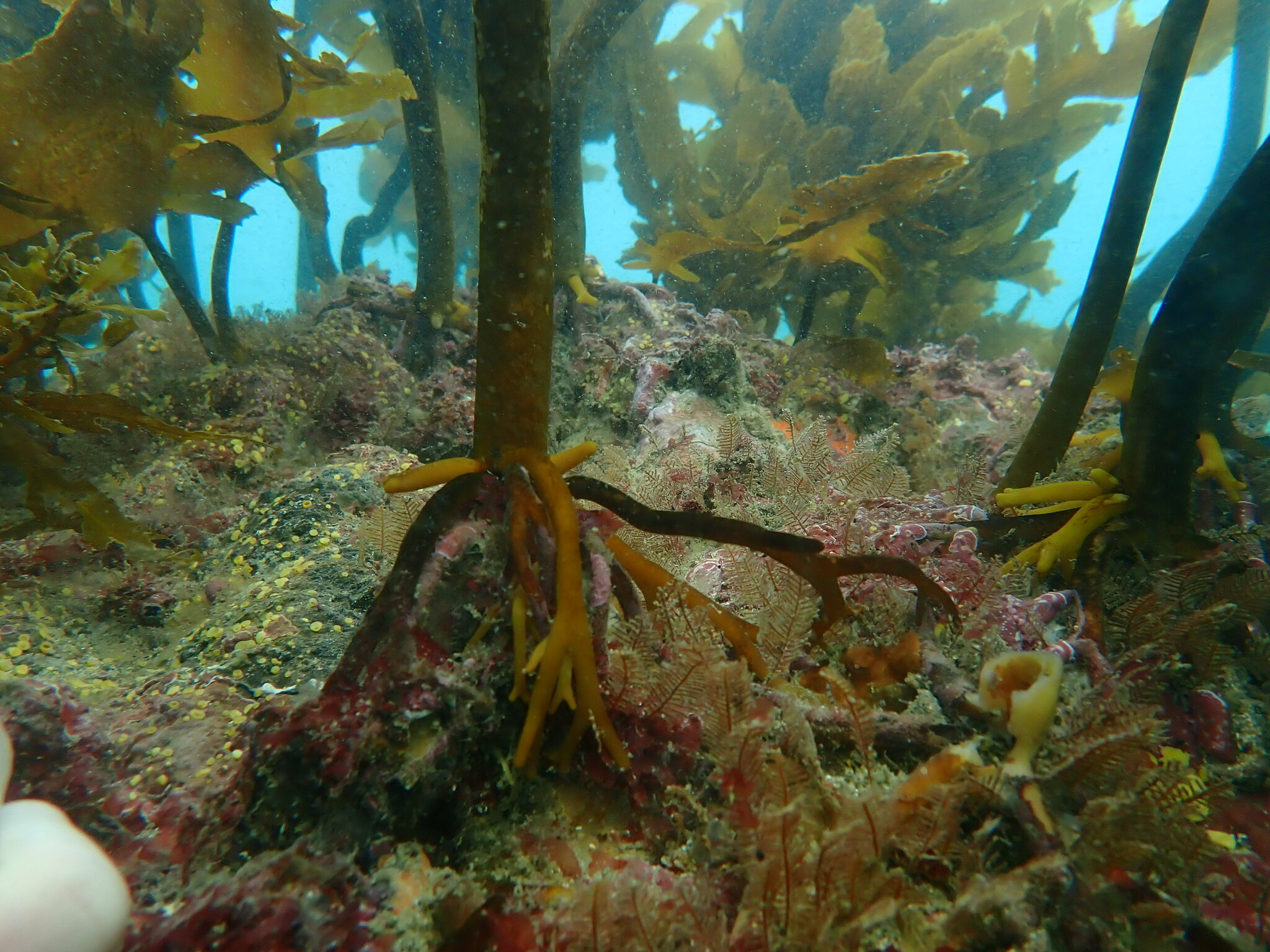
The species is often found living on kelp such as Ecklonia radiata.

The species is endemic to New Zealand, known to occur on both coasts of the North Island and South Island. In addition, the species can be found on the Chatham Islands and the volcanic island Whakaari / White Island.

Typically the species can be found on algae at low tide, underneath intertidal rocks, and often lives on kelp species such as Ecklonia radiata.

== Ocean acidification studies ==
Eatoniella mortoni has been used as a species to study ocean acidification, as the species benefits from living in carbon dioxide-rich environments and remains localised, especially specimens sourced from the volcanic island Whakaari / White Island, due to their lifetime exposure to carbon dioxide vents. Eatoniella mortoni can produce more crystalline, durable and less porous shells at natural carbon dioxide vents.

== Gallery ==
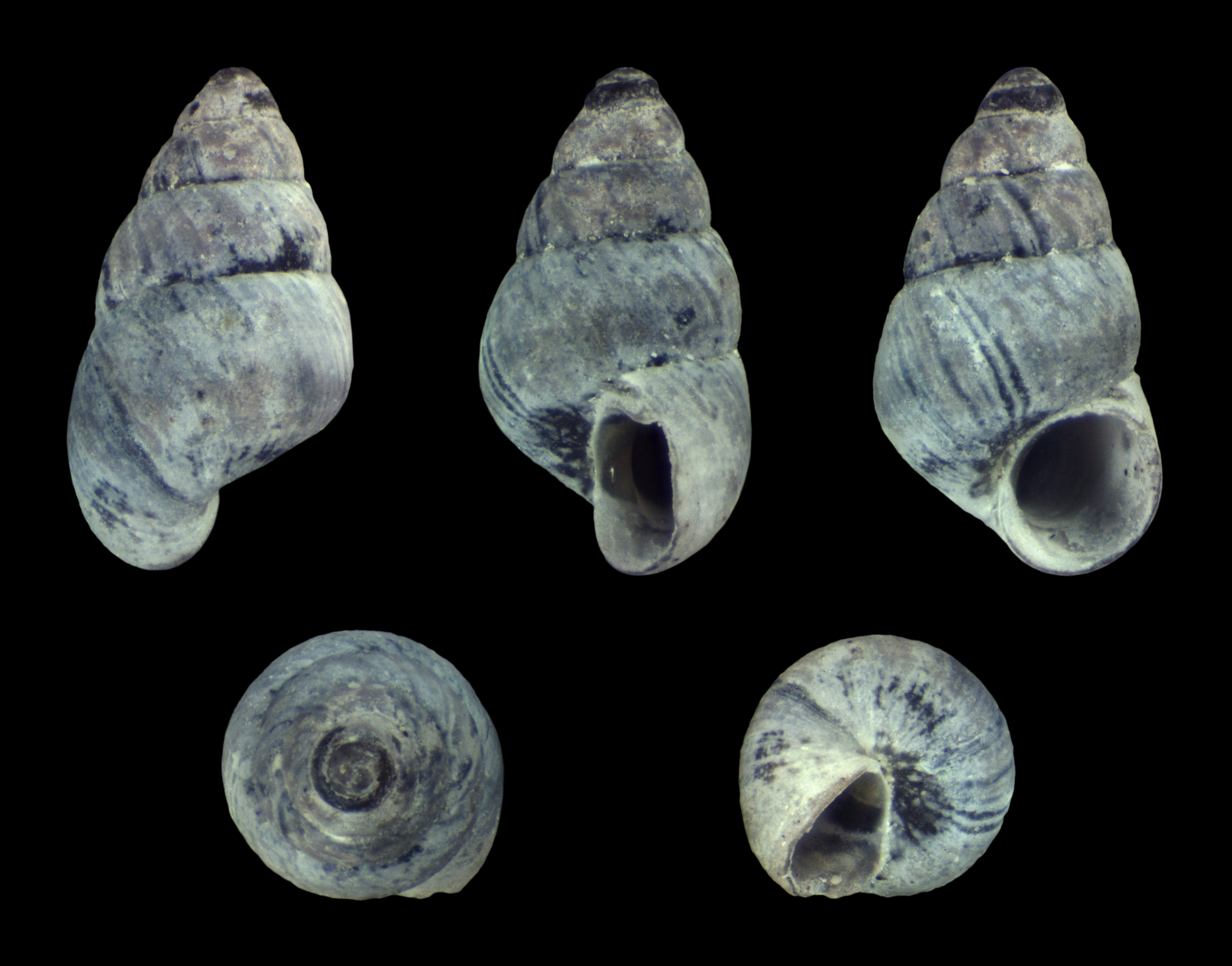
Different angle views of an E. mortoni specimen found in Abel Tasman National Park

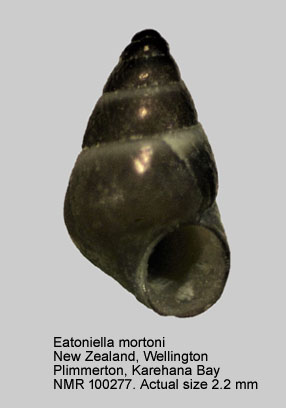
E. mortoni specimen from Karehana Bay, Wellington Region
