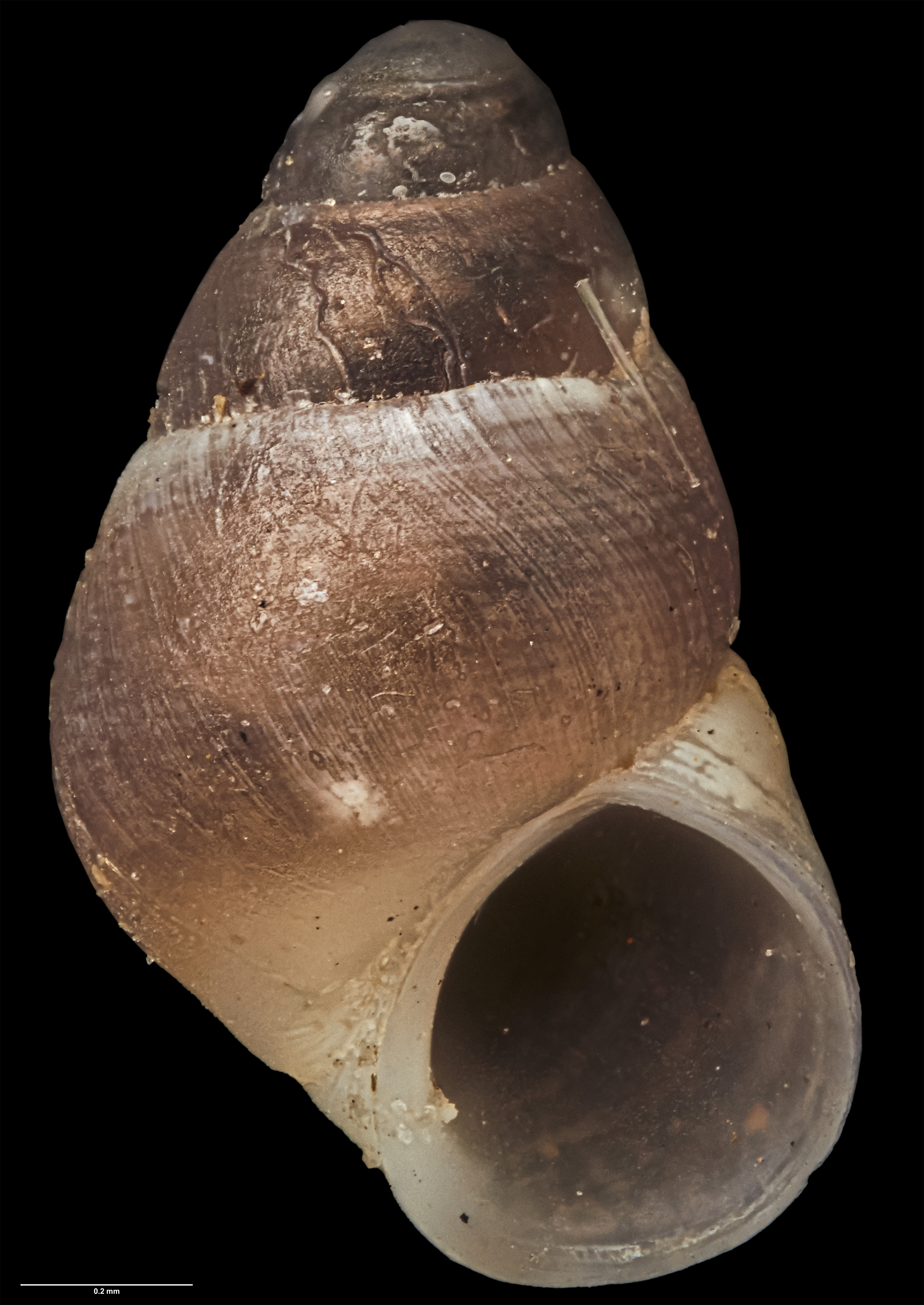
- Holotype of Eatoniella bathamae from Auckland War Memorial Museum

Scientific classification
- Kingdom: Animalia
- Phylum: Mollusca
- Class: Gastropoda
- Subclass: Caenogastropoda
- Order: Littorinimorpha
- Superfamily: Cingulopsoidea
- Family: Eatoniellidae
- Genus: Eatoniella
- Species: E. bathamae

Binomial name
- Eatoniella bathamae Ponder, 1965

Synonyms
- Eatoniella bathami Ponder, 1965; Eatoniella (Cerostraca) bathami Ponder, 1965; Eatoniella (Cerostraca) bathamae Ponder, 1965; Eatoniella (Eatoniella) bathamae Ponder, 1965

= Eatoniella bathamae =

Species of gastropod

Eatoniella bathamae is a species of marine gastropod mollusc in the family Eatoniellidae. First described by Winston Ponder in 1965, it is endemic to New Zealand, found in the waters of the southern South Island, Stewart Island, the Snares Islands / Tini Heke and the Auckland Islands.

== Description ==
In the original description, Ponder described the species as follows:

Shell, small, conical, rather large for [the subgenus Cerostraca], moderately solid, smooth, shining, variable in colour. The spire with 4 weakly convex whorls; protoconch smooth, not marked off; sutures weakly incised, false margined; body whorl large, periphery slightly angled, base convex. Surface smooth except for faint growth lines, also a few very faint spiral scratches visible. Aperture large, rounded, slightly angled above, peristome thickened. Outer lip excavated below, produced forward posteriorly where it is bent downwards. A slight swelling just behind outer lip and in the upper quarter of whorl, is only indication of characteristic varix-like thickening of subgenus. Columella moderately thick, concave, inner lip partly covering a small umbilical chink. Colour variable, usually dark greyish-purple to pale grey or yellowish white. Holotype pale greyish with a purple tinge. A diffuse white band below the periphery is often present and, in the holotype, is visible on the body whorl. Body whorl usually paler in colour than rest of shell, and a distinct white patch around umbilical area. Specimens vary considerably in colour, size and shape. Small shells are usually broad, large shells often narrow. In some populations most shells are white (e.g. in algae, Halfmoon Bay, Stewart Island), while in others there are no white individuals (e.g. type series).

Animal: (Halfmoon Bay, Stewart Island). External parts unpigmented (preserved material).
Operculum: Oval, slightly curved, yellowish-white, growth lines hardly visible, marginal areas narrow. Peg short, wide. Muscle insertion area extensive, dense.

Radula: Very similar to that of E. (C.) delli. Central 3 + 1 + 3, the outermost cusp very minute. Lateral 2 + 1 + 3; inner marginal 3 + 1, the outermost denticle largest. Outer marginal finely serrate.

E. bathamae measures 1.42 mm (0.056 in) by 0.8 mm (0.031 in), and can range from ovate to conic.

== Taxonomy ==
The species was first described by Winston Ponder in 1965, who used the name Eatoniella (Cerostraca) bathami. The species is named after Betty Batham, who assisted Ponder during his stay at the Portobello Marine Laboratory. The modern formatting of the name without a subgenus, Eatoniella bathami, was established by Hamish Spencer and Richard C. Willan in 1995. The species epithet spelling was altered to bathamae due to the name using an incorrect gender ending. The holotype of the species was collected by Ponder himself on 5 September 1963, on gelatinous red algae at Papanui Beach, Dunedin. It is held by the Auckland War Memorial Museum.

== Distribution and habitat ==
The species is endemic to New Zealand, found in the waters of the southern South Island, Stewart Island, the Snares Islands / Tini Heke, and the Auckland Islands, in depths ranging between 0–18 m (0–59 ft) below sea level. E. bathamae is known to live on algae.
