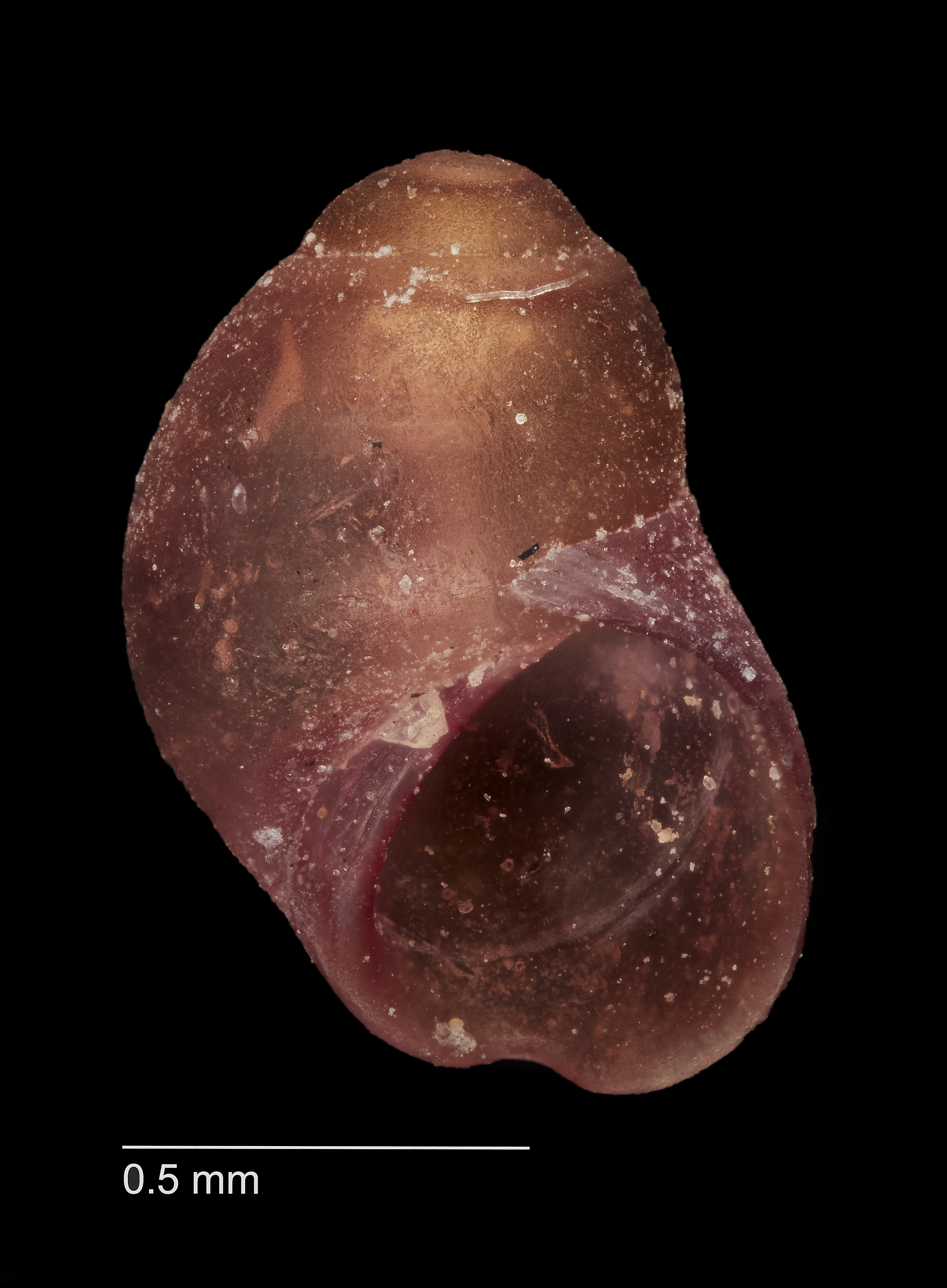
- Holotype of Eatoniella globosa from Auckland War Memorial Museum

Scientific classification
- Kingdom: Animalia
- Phylum: Mollusca
- Class: Gastropoda
- Subclass: Caenogastropoda
- Order: Littorinimorpha
- Family: Eatoniellidae
- Genus: Eatoniella
- Species: †E. globosa

Binomial name
- †Eatoniella globosa Ponder, 1965

Synonyms
- Eatoniella (Dardaniopsis) globosa Ponder, 1965; Eatoniella (Eatoniella) globosa Ponder, 1965

= Eatoniella globosa =

Species of gastropod

Eatoniella globosa is a species of marine gastropod mollusc in the family Eatoniellidae. It was first described by Winston F. Ponder in 1965. It is endemic to the waters of New Zealand, found in the waters of the upper North Island.

== Description ==
In the original description, Powell described the species as follows:

Shell thin, fragile, inflated, pinkish, semi-transparent. Whorls three, weakly convex, false margined, with subobsolete spiral scratches. Protoconch dome-shaped, similarly sculptured to the adult whorls, from which it is not marked off. Body whorl comprises most of shell, globose; a weak spiral ridge runs around the convex periphery. Umbilicus large, deep, crescentric, surrounded by a sharp ridge. Aperture pear-shaped, with a slightly thickened, strongly retracted, outer lip which has two chinks, one in middle, other posteriorly. Peristome continuous, rather thin, columella very slightly concave. Colour of first two whorls yellowish brown, the rest pinkish. Umbilical region, columella, and outer lip bright pinkish.

The holotype of the species measures 1.15 mm (0.045 in) in height and with a width of 0.8 mm (0.031 in). It has a similar but distinct appearance when compared to E. notalabia.

== Taxonomy ==
The species was first described by Winston F. Ponder in 1965 as Eatoniella (Dardaniopsis) globosa. In 1995, Hamish Spencer and Richard C. Willan established the species' modern name, Eatoniella globosa, removing the subgenus Dardaniopsis. The current accepted name of the species is either Eatoniella globosa, or alternatively Eatoniella (Eatoniella) globosa. The holotype was collected in 1949 by K. Hipkins from Piwhane / Spirits Bay, to the north of the Aupouri Peninsula in the Far North District, New Zealand. It is held in the collections of Auckland War Memorial Museum.

== Distribution and habitat ==
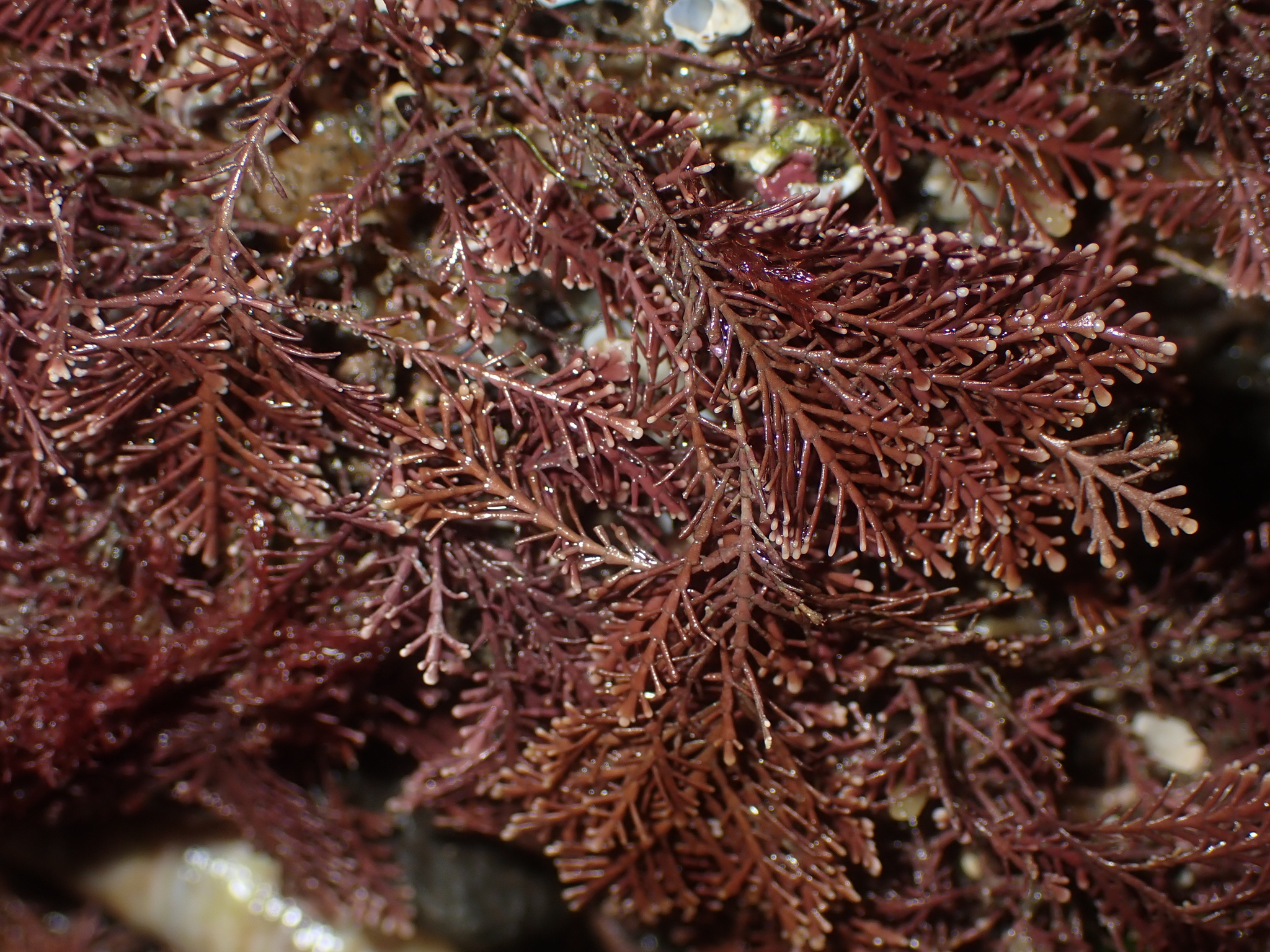
Corallina sp. red seaweeds, which have been identified as common habitats for Eatoniella globosa

The species is endemic to New Zealand, found in the waters surrounding the north and north-eastern coasts of the North Island. In 2005, a specimen of Eatoniella globosa was found off the coast of Raglan, extending its known range to the west coast of the North Island. Rare specimens have been found in the Tamaki River of Auckland.

Eatoniella globosa has been shown to live almost exclusively on a species of red Corallina seaweed.
