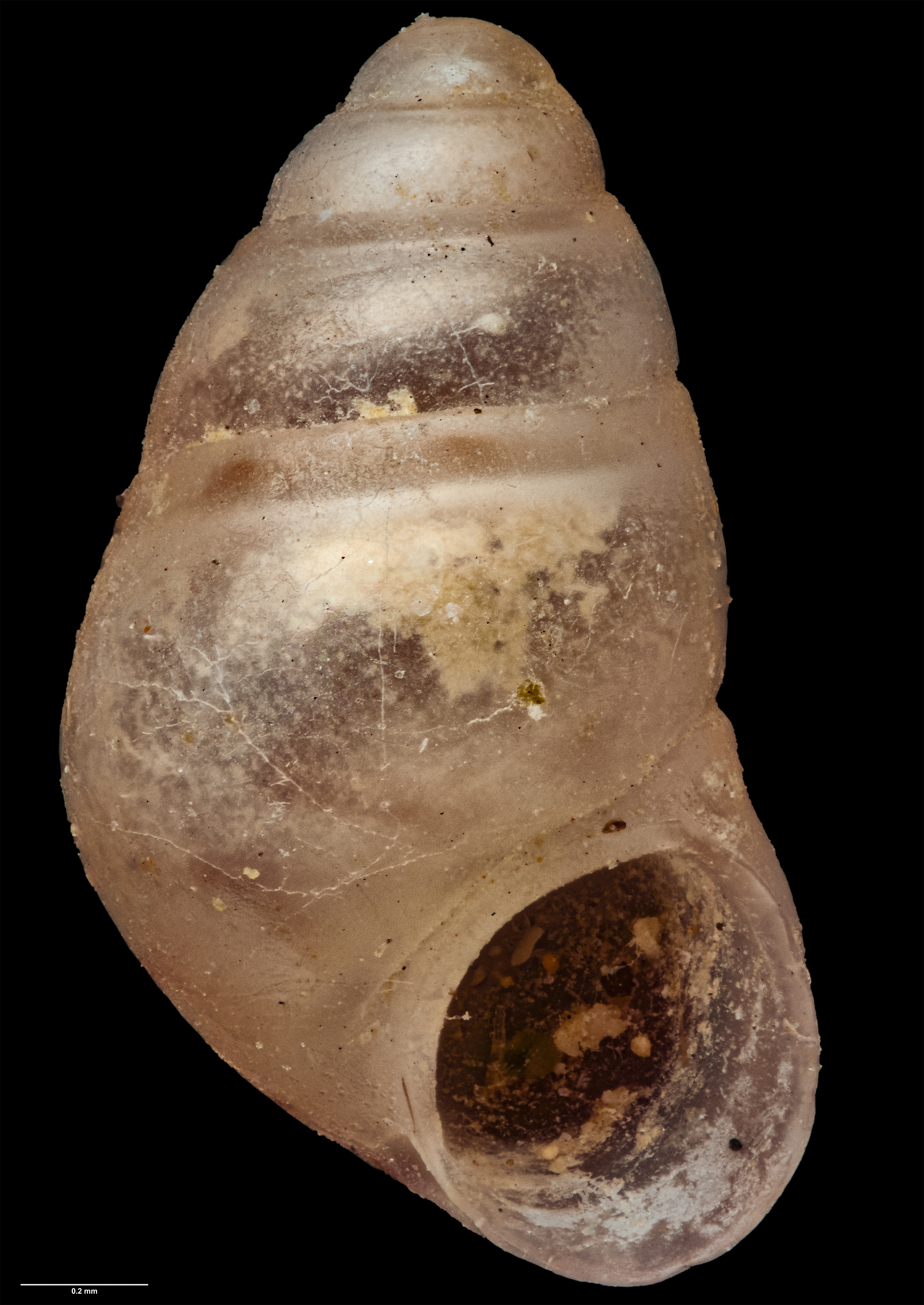
- Holotype of Eatoniella fossa from Auckland War Memorial Museum

Scientific classification
- Kingdom: Animalia
- Phylum: Mollusca
- Class: Gastropoda
- Subclass: Caenogastropoda
- Order: Littorinimorpha
- Superfamily: Cingulopsoidea
- Family: Eatoniellidae
- Genus: Eatoniella
- Species: E. fossa

Binomial name
- Eatoniella fossa Ponder, 1965

Synonyms
- Eatoniella (Eatoniella) fossa Ponder, 1965; Eatoniella (Dardanula) fossa Ponder, 1965

= Eatoniella fossa =

Species of gastropod

Eatoniella fossa is a species of marine gastropod mollusc in the family Eatoniellidae. First described by Winston Ponder in 1965, it is endemic to New Zealand, found in waters off the northeastern coast of the North Island, the Hen and Chicken Islands, Manawatāwhi / Three Kings Islands, and the sea banks that surround Manawatāwhi.

== Description ==
In the original description, Ponder described the species as follows:

Shell of medium size for [the subgenus Dardanula], solid, smooth, shining, ovate-conic, a groove between inner-lip and body whorl, Spire rather tall, very slightly convex; whorls 4 1/2, faintly convex, smooth and polished; protoconch smooth, small; sutures distinctly false margined; body whorl with a rounded periphery and base. Aperture small, rounded, slightly angled posteriorly, with a deep groove between inner lip and body whorl. Peristome continuous, thickened, especially in posterior corner; outer lip thickened) internally, with a sharp edge, hardly excavated. Colour of dead shells varies from brownish-yellow to white, a band below the sutures may be darker or lighter than rest of shell; aperture and umbilical region white. A few irregular zig-zag markings sometimes developed on last part of body whorl from a peripherial dark band or small dark blotches. The dark subsutural band, if present, may break up into irregular blotches on the body whorl. Holotype yellowish-white with a few faint brown blotches on last part of body whorl and a large reddish-brown blotch just behind aperture.

E. fossa measures 1.9 mm (0.075 in) by 1.2 mm (0.047 in). It can be distinguished from other members of Eatoniella due to the channel between the aperture and the body whorl. The species is superficially similar in appearance to Anabathron.

== Taxonomy ==
The species was first described by Winston Ponder in 1965, who used the name Eatoniella (Dardanula) fossa. The modern formatting of the name without a subgenus, Eatoniella fossa, was established by Hamish Spencer and Richard C. Willan in 1995. The holotype of the species was collected by K. Hipkins on 29 December 1953 at a depth of 40 m (130 ft) off the west coast of Stephenson Island in the Whangaroa Harbour, Northland. It is held by the Auckland War Memorial Museum.

== Distribution and habitat ==
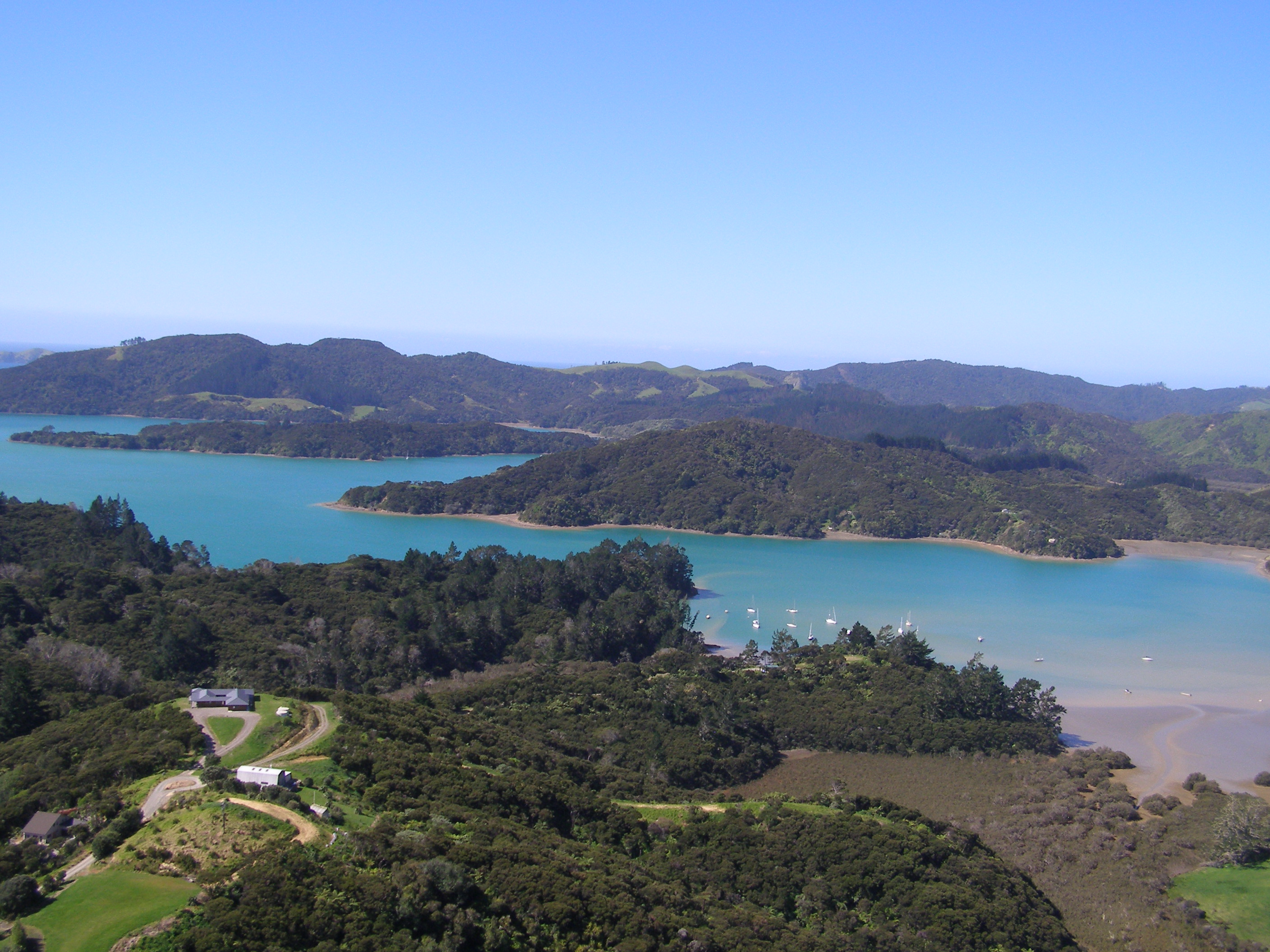
The species was first identified in the Whangaroa Harbour

The species is endemic to New Zealand, found off the northeastern coast of the North Island, as far east as Hicks Bay, as well as the Hen and Chicken Islands, Manawatāwhi / Three Kings Islands, and the Middlesex and King banks off the coast of Manawatāwhi / Three Kings Islands. The species lives between a depth of 0–622 m (0–2,041 ft) below sea level.
