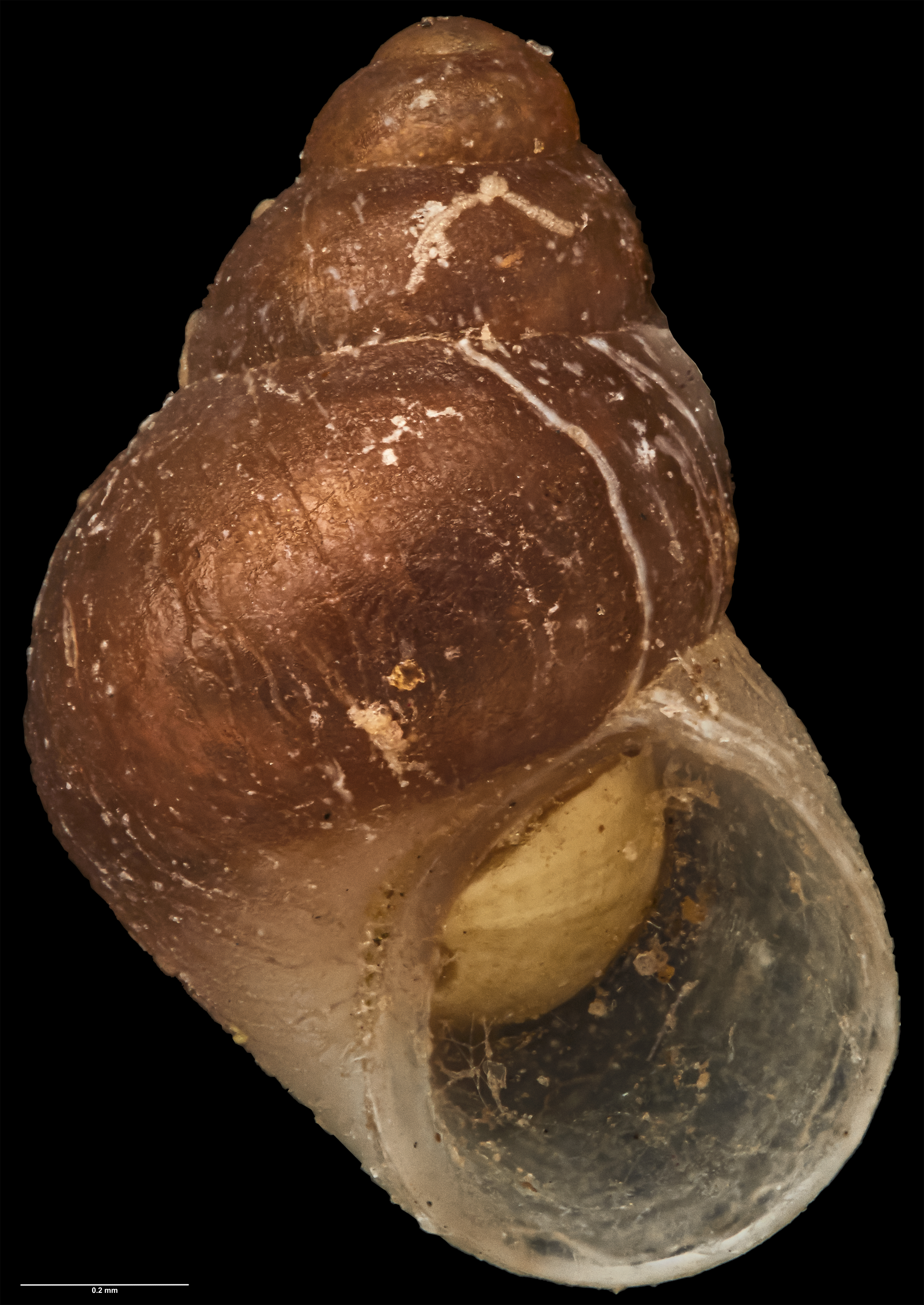
- Holotype of Eatoniella fuscosubucula from Auckland War Memorial Museum

Scientific classification
- Kingdom: Animalia
- Phylum: Mollusca
- Class: Gastropoda
- Subclass: Caenogastropoda
- Order: Littorinimorpha
- Superfamily: Cingulopsoidea
- Family: Eatoniellidae
- Genus: Eatoniella
- Species: E. fuscosubucula

Binomial name
- Eatoniella fuscosubucula Ponder, 1965

Synonyms
- Eatoniella (Dardanula) fuscosubucula Ponder, 1965; Eatoniella (Eatoniella) fuscosubucula Ponder, 1965

= Eatoniella fuscosubucula =

Species of gastropod

Eatoniella fuscosubucula is a species of marine gastropod mollusc in the family Eatoniellidae. First described by Winston Ponder in 1965, it is endemic to New Zealand, found low tide and moderately deep water around the southern South Island, Stewart Island, the Auckland Islands, and around Hicks Bay in the eastern North Island.

== Description ==
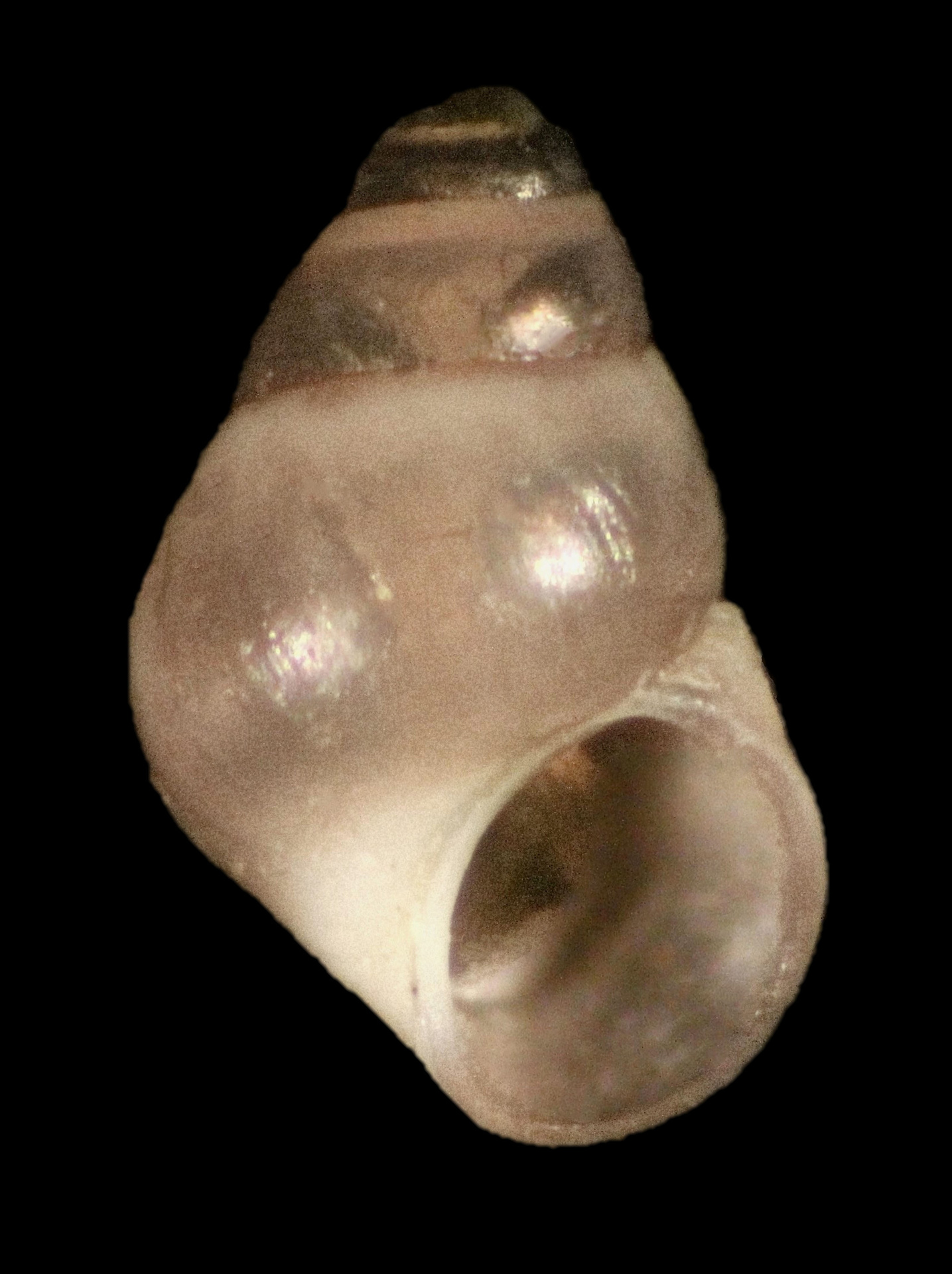
Type specimen from Curio Bay, Southland

In the original description, Ponder described the species as follows:

Shell small, broadly conical, with a large D-shaped aperture, white, but with a brown, inner chitinous layer showing through. Spire short, whorls 4, rapidly increasing, convex, sutures indistinctly false margined; body whorl large, swollen, periphery and base rounded. Aperture large, D-shaped; peristome thickened, continuous; inner lip concave, wide, expanded, columella nearly vertical, produced below. Outer lip thickened posteriorly and internally, sharp edged and strongly excavated. Colour of spire dark yellowish-brown due to chitinous layer showing through, the otherwise transparent-white. Aperture and lower part of base white.

Animal: (Portobello). Unpigmented, and typical of the genus. (Preserved material).
Operculum: D-shaped, convex, marginal areas wide, transparent, yellowish, peg curved, solid, grooved. Muscle insertion area extensive, yellow. Very weak growth lines and spirals present.

Radula: Central rather small, 2 + 1 + 2; lateral 2 + 1 + 2, with dorsal and ventral thickenings. Inner marginal with one broad cusp and a long basal process. Outer marginal finely serrate, with a broad base. The structure of the inner marginal tooth is unique in the family.

The species measures 1.4 mm (0.055 in) by 0.95 mm (0.037 in). It can be distinguished from E. dilatata due to its colour and larger size, and from E. verecunda due to its smaller size, larger aperture, thinner shell and brown inner layer.

== Taxonomy ==
The species was first described by Winston Ponder in 1965, who used the name Eatoniella (Dardanula) fuscosubucula. The modern convention of formatting of the name without a subgenus (as Eatoniella fuscosubucula) was established by Hamish Spencer and Richard C. Willan in 1995. The holotype was collected by Elsie C. Smith in January 1950 from Paterson Inlet, Stewart Island. It is held by the Auckland War Memorial Museum.

== Distribution and habitat ==
The species is endemic to New Zealand, found in southern South Island, Stewart Island, the Auckland Islands, and around Hicks Bay in the eastern North Island. The species is found in low tide to moderately deep water, ranging in depths between 0–55 m (0–180 ft) below sea level.
