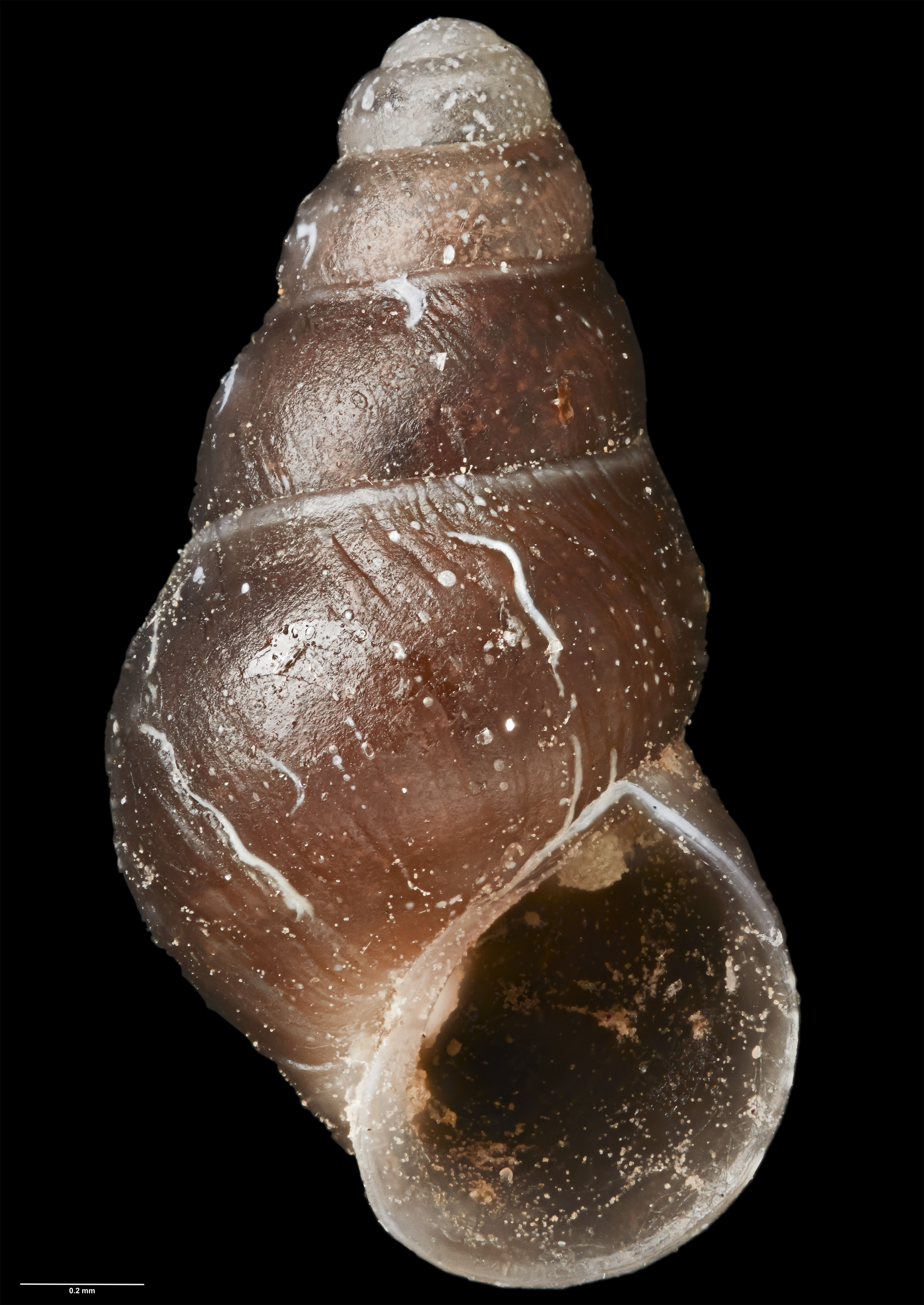
- Holotype of Eatoniella stewartiana from Auckland War Memorial Museum

Scientific classification
- Kingdom: Animalia
- Phylum: Mollusca
- Class: Gastropoda
- Subclass: Caenogastropoda
- Order: Littorinimorpha
- Family: Eatoniellidae
- Genus: Eatoniella
- Species: E. stewartiana

Binomial name
- Eatoniella stewartiana (Ponder, 1965)

Synonyms
- Eatoniella (Eatoniella) stewartiana Ponder 1965

= Eatoniella stewartiana =

Species of gastropod

Eatoniella stewartiana is a species of marine gastropod mollusc in the family Eatoniellidae. First described by Winston Ponder in 1965, it is endemic to the waters of New Zealand.

== Description ==
Eatoniella stewartiana has an evenly retracted outer lip. The shell is purplish black in colour, with a pale grey/transparent protoconch. The species measures 2mm by 1.15mm.

The species closely resembles Eatoniella kerguelenensis subsp. chiltoni, but can be differentiated by its smaller sizer, thinner, emi-transparent shell and false margined sutures.

== Distribution ==
The species is endemic to New Zealand. The holotype was collected in September 1962 by Elsie Smith on Ocean Beach, Stewart Island, near high tide on Bostrychia red algae. The species is found in the waters of Stewart Island and the south-east of the South Island, living in algae in most of intertidal zone. On the West Coast, the species has been recorded as far north as Haast, and on the east coast as far north as Waikouaiti. The species appears to replace Eatoniella kerguelenensis subsp. chiltoni in Southland and Stewart Island. Both species overlap in range in the Otago Harbour.

Fossil evidence has shown that Eatoniella stewartiana was very common on the coastal terraces near modern-day Kaikōura Peninsula during the Pleistocene era.
