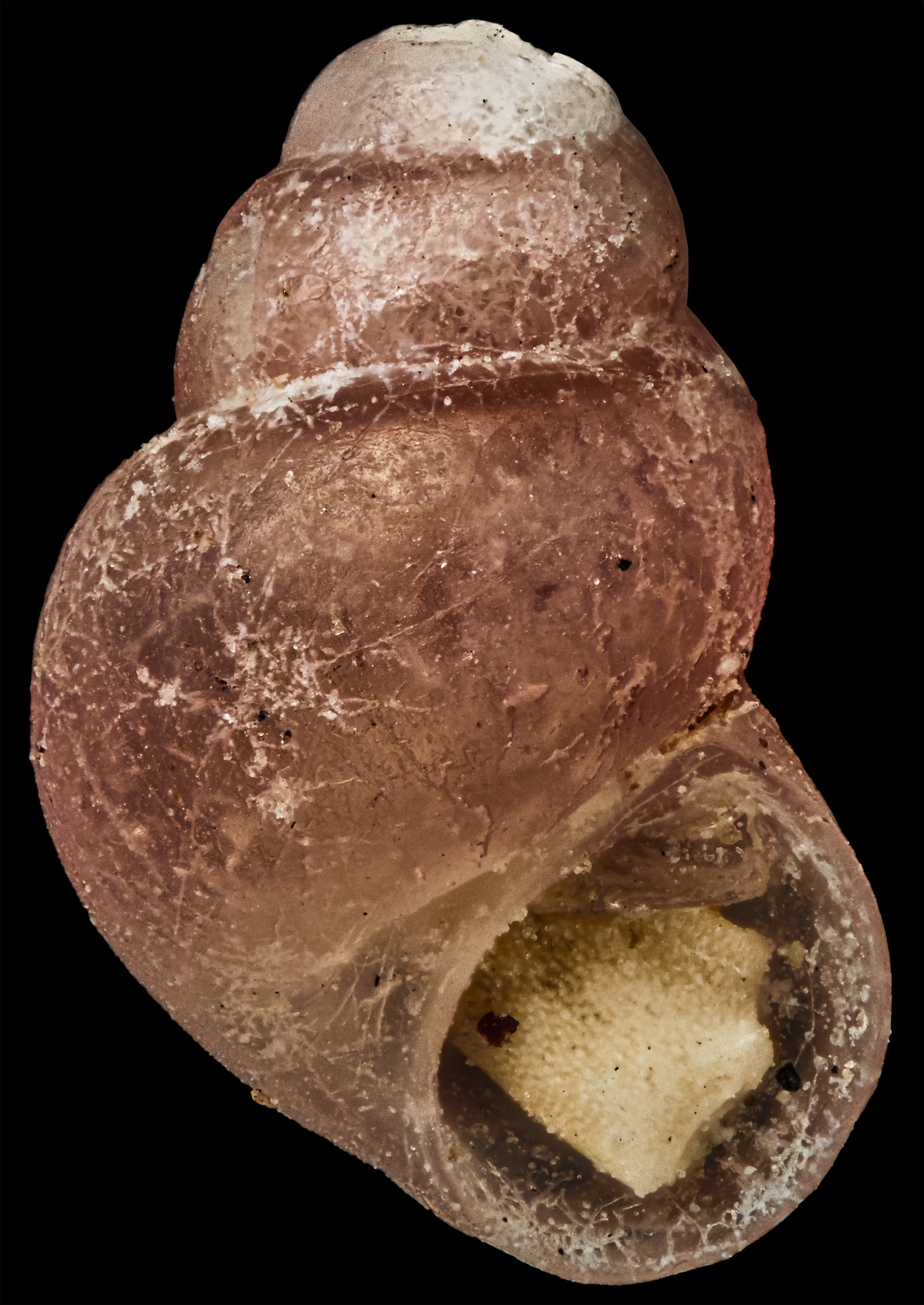
- Paratype of Eatoniella puniceomacer from Auckland War Memorial Museum

Scientific classification
- Kingdom: Animalia
- Phylum: Mollusca
- Class: Gastropoda
- Subclass: Caenogastropoda
- Order: Littorinimorpha
- Superfamily: Cingulopsoidea
- Family: Eatoniellidae
- Genus: Eatoniella
- Species: E. puniceomacer

Binomial name
- Eatoniella puniceomacer Ponder, 1965

Synonyms
- Eatoniella (Caveatoniella) puniceomacer Ponder, 1965

= Eatoniella puniceomacer =

Species of gastropod

Eatoniella puniceomacer is a species of marine gastropod mollusc in the family Eatoniellidae. First described by Winston Ponder in 1965, it is endemic to New Zealand, found in the waters off the coast of the North Island (typically to the north-east) and Manawatāwhi / Three Kings Islands.

== Description ==
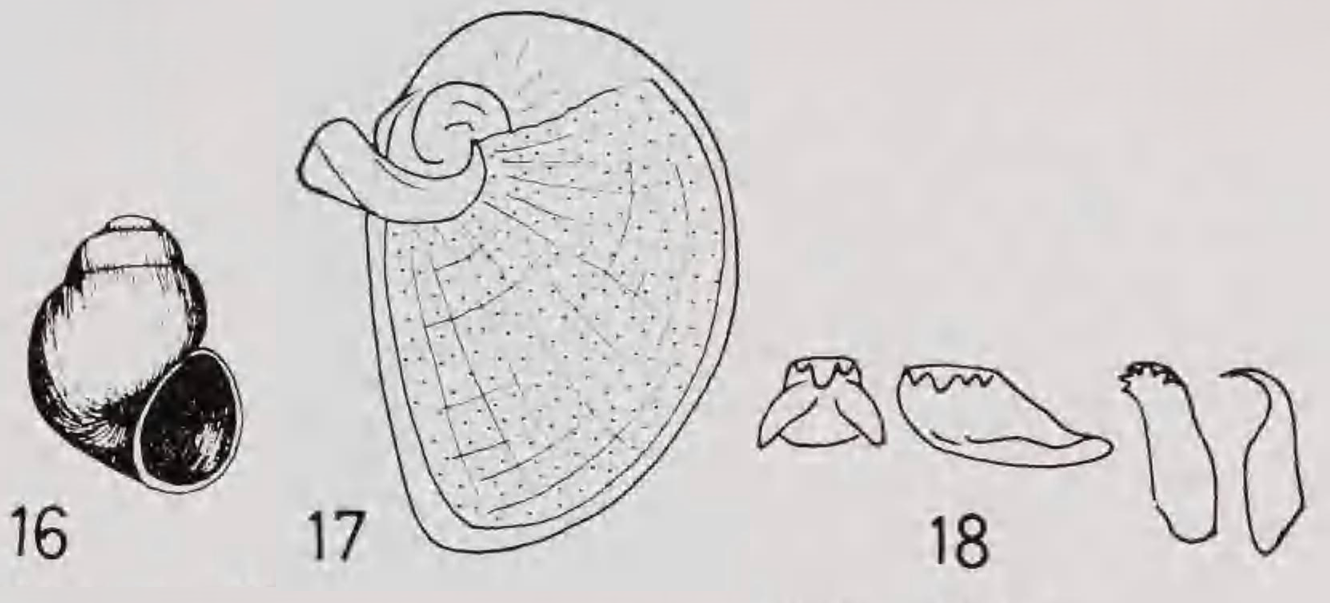
Diagrams of E. puniceomacer: holotype of shell (left), operculum (inner side) (centre) and radula (right).

In the original description, Ponder described the species as follows:

Shell minute, thin, semi-transparent, pink, rather loosely coiled, with a wide umbilicus. Whorls 3 1/2, strongly convex, a little flattened on shoulder, protoconch rather flattened. Spire variable in height, the shoulder not present in tall shells, but flattened and cut in at sutures in squat shells (holotype intermediate). Sutures false margined. Sculpture of growth lines only, becoming prominent around the large, deep, circular umbilicus. Aperture oval, peristome continuous, nearly completely separated from body whorl, only slightly thickened, The outer lip is not retracted. Colour uniform pale pink, protoconch white. Fresh shells are purplish-black owing to the colour of the visceral mass.

Animal: (Taurikura Bay). Cephalic tentacles long, not tapering, bluntly pointed, colourless, eyes at outer bases of tentacles. Snout short, bilobed. Foot with a mucous slit in posterior half. No opercular tentacles. Eyes and snout remain beneath transparent edge of shell.
Operculum: (Off Mayor Island). Thickened, slightly curved, muscle insertion area opaque, extensive, marginal area rather narrow and clear. Peg rather long and narrow, solid, white. Sculptured with faint spirals and weak growth lines.

Radula: Central rather small for genus, with two very strong basal processes, cusps 1 + 1 + 1, central cusp strong. Lateral 1 + 1 + 2, the cusp small. Inner marginal with 5 moderately strong denticles; outer marginal finely serrate, with broad basal portion.

The species measures 0.95 mm (0.037 in) by 0.73 mm (0.029 in). Shells of E. puniceomacer are subglobose.

== Taxonomy ==
The species was first described by Winston Ponder in 1965, who used the name Eatoniella (Caveatoniella) puniceomacer, and defined the species as the type species for the subgenus Caveatoniella. The holotype was collected Tryphena Bay, Great Barrier Island at an unknown date prior to 1965, and was formerly held by the Auckland War Memorial Museum, but has been missing since at least 1996.

== Distribution and habitat ==
The species is endemic to New Zealand, found on the coast of the North Island (typically to the north-east), as well as Great Barrier Island, Manawatāwhi / Three Kings Islands and King Bank. The species tends to be found in shallow water, but can be found at a depth of up to 805 m (2,641 ft) below sea level.
