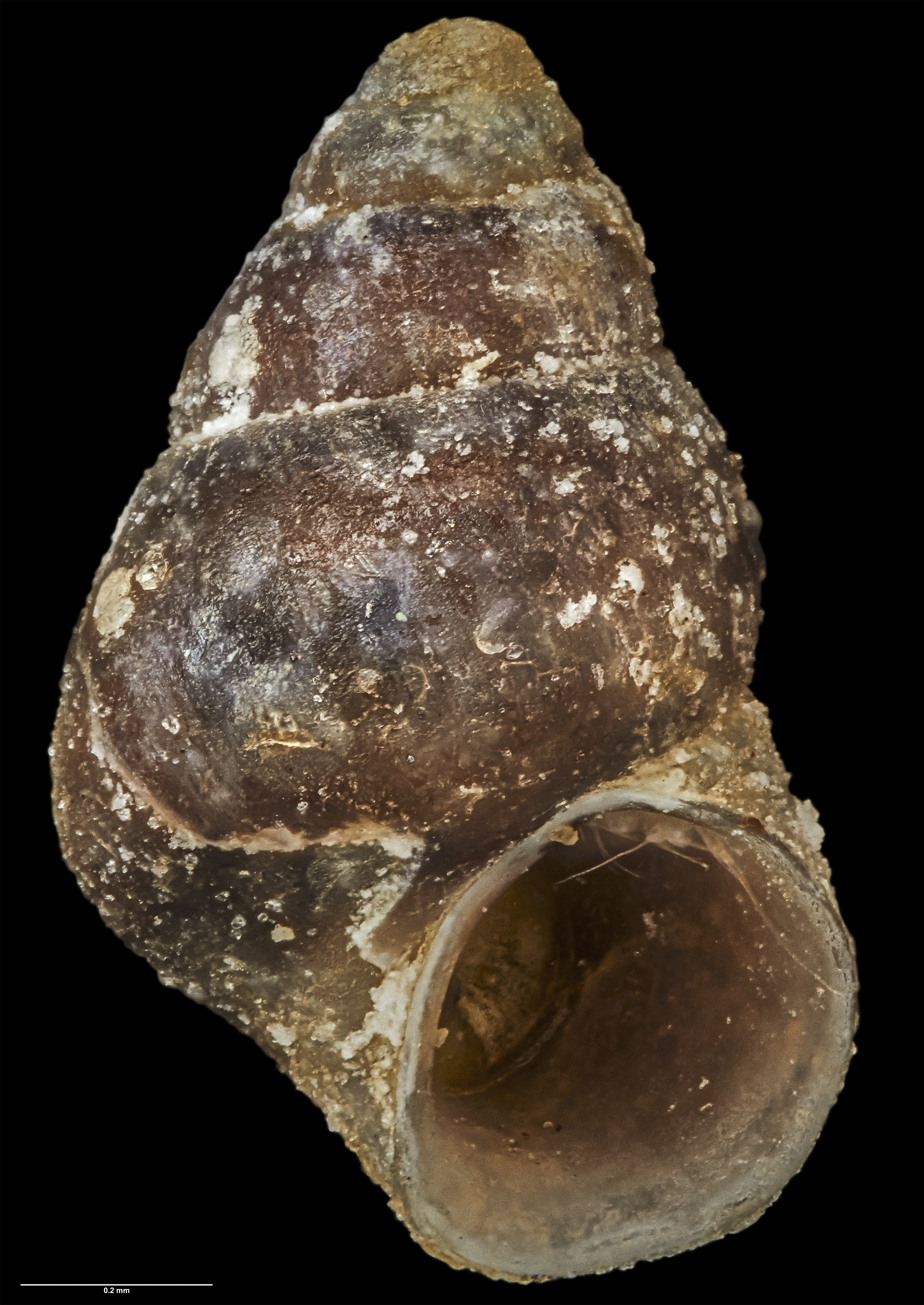
- Holotype of Eatoniella delli from Auckland War Memorial Museum

Scientific classification
- Kingdom: Animalia
- Phylum: Mollusca
- Class: Gastropoda
- Subclass: Caenogastropoda
- Order: Littorinimorpha
- Superfamily: Cingulopsoidea
- Family: Eatoniellidae
- Genus: Eatoniella
- Species: E. delli

Binomial name
- Eatoniella delli Ponder, 1965

Synonyms
- Eatoniella (Cerostraca) delli Ponder, 1965; Eatoniella (Eatoniella) delli Ponder, 1965

= Eatoniella delli =

Species of gastropod

Eatoniella delli is a species of marine gastropod mollusc in the family Eatoniellidae. First described by Winston Ponder in 1965, it is endemic to New Zealand, often found in finely divided low tide algae.

== Description ==
In the original description, Ponder described the species as follows:

Shell minute, dark purplish, conical, smooth. Whorls 4 1/2, slightly convex, sutures moderately impressed. Protoconch smooth, not marked off. Sutures false-margined by a dark band. Body whorl subangled at periphery, base flatly convex. Colour purplish, the protoconch pale yellow, semi-transparent, aperture grey. Aperture oval, angled anteriorly and posteriorly; columella strongly concave; umbilical chink very small; outer lip much retracted, bent forwards posteriorly and reflected at edge. A weak, varix-like swelling a little behind outer lip.

Animal: Cephalic tentacles colourless, long, active. Snout bilobed, short, black on sides and dorsally; buccal mass yellow, showing through integument. Eyes rather small, on slight swellings, at bases of tentacles and visible beneath transparent edge of shell. Opercular lobe black, with or without a short tentacle on left side, with a small group of mucous cells on right side. Foot long, bluntly rounded anteriorly, with a small anterior mucous gland. Posterior mucous gland large, opening into a long slit extending from middle of sole to posterior end.
Operculum: Thickened, slightly curved, yellowish. Muscle insertion area extensive, opaque, columella edge a raised rim. Peg short and solid. Marginal area is moderately wide. Faint growth lines are the only sculpture.

Radula: Typical of the genus. Central 3 + 1 + 3, lateral 2+ 1+ 3, with a strong basal thickening and a weaker dorsal rib. Inner marginal 3 + 1 + 1, the denticles of similar size, though fourth a little larger; outer marginal with fine serrations.

While the holotype of E. delli measures 1.24 mm (0.049 in) by 0.73 mm (0.029 in), the species shows considerable variation in size, as well as shape and colour. It can be differentiated from E. iredalei due to its shorter spire, larger aperture and weaker varix.

== Taxonomy ==
The species was first described by Winston Ponder in 1965, who used the name Eatoniella (Cerostraca) delli. The species is named after Richard Dell, who assisted and advised Ponder during his work exploring the Eatoniellidae family. The modern convention of formatting of the name without a subgenus (as Eatoniella delli) was established by Hamish Spencer and Richard C. Willan in 1995. The holotype of the species was collected by Ponder himself on 21 August 1963, on Corallina red seaweed at Bream Tail, Northland. It is held by the Auckland War Memorial Museum.

== Distribution and habitat ==
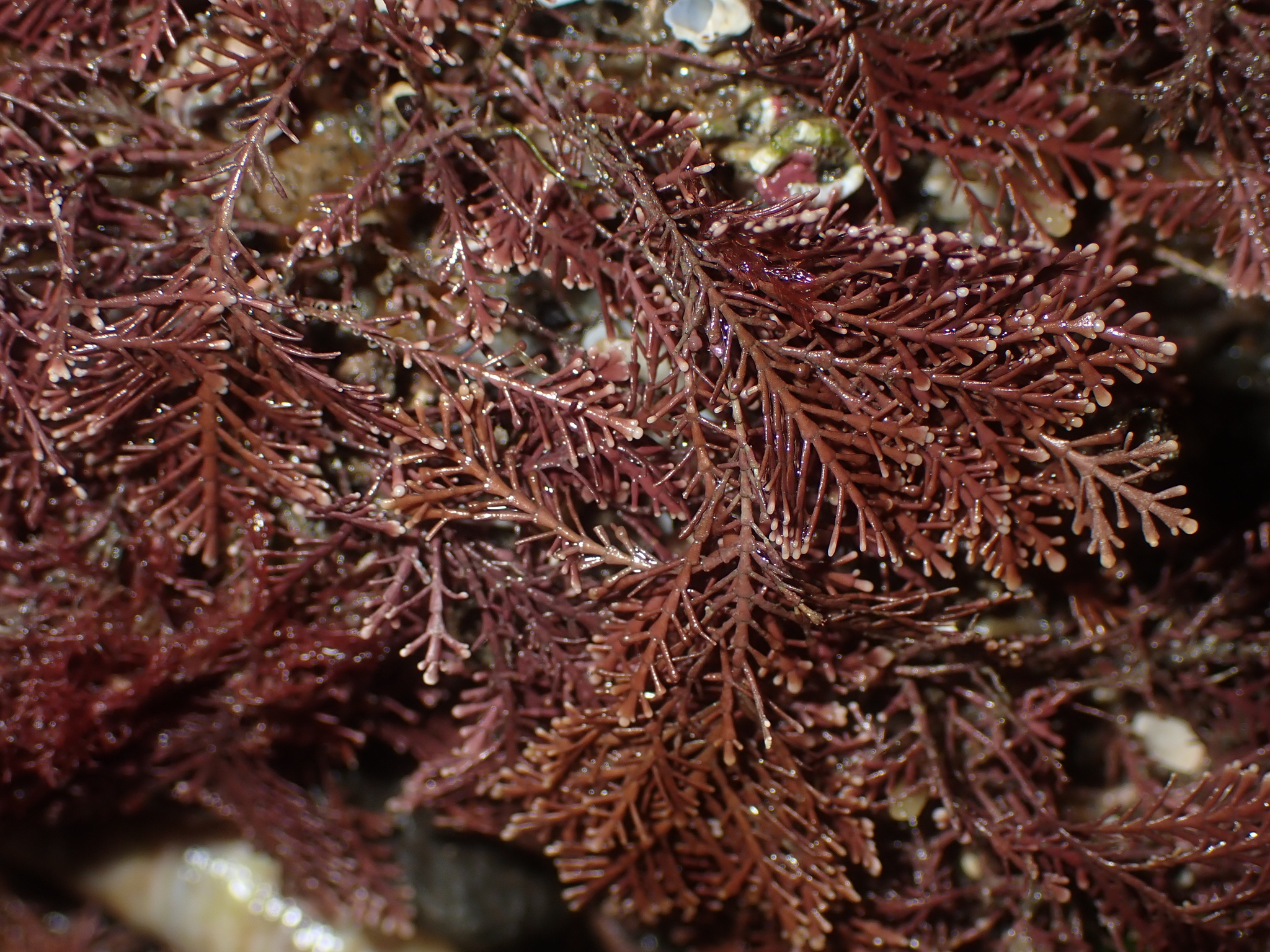
Corallina sp. red seaweeds, which have been identified as common habitats for Eatoniella delli

The species is endemic to New Zealand, found in the waters of the North Island, South Island, Chatham Islands and the Auckland Islands. The species prefers finely divided low tide algae, including Corallina seaweeds, but can live on large algae and be found under stones.
