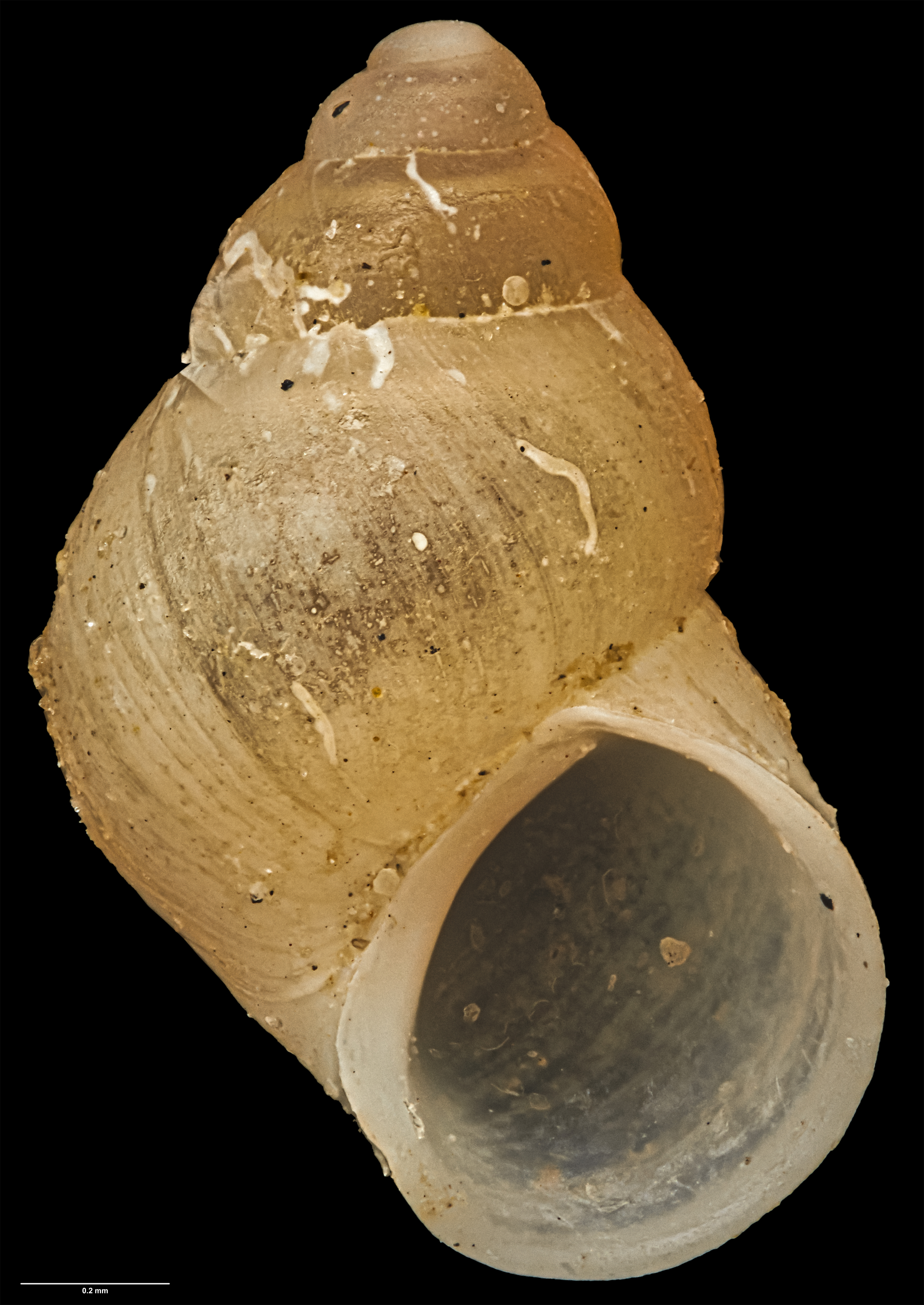
- Holotype of Eatoniella latebricola from Auckland War Memorial Museum

Scientific classification
- Kingdom: Animalia
- Phylum: Mollusca
- Class: Gastropoda
- Subclass: Caenogastropoda
- Order: Littorinimorpha
- Superfamily: Cingulopsoidea
- Family: Eatoniellidae
- Genus: Eatoniella
- Species: E. latebricola

Binomial name
- Eatoniella latebricola Ponder, 1965

Synonyms
- Eatoniella (Dardanula) latebricola Ponder, 1965; Eatoniella (Eatoniella) latebricola Ponder, 1965

= Eatoniella latebricola =

Species of gastropod

Eatoniella latebricola is a species of marine gastropod mollusc in the family Eatoniellidae. It was first described by Winston Ponder in 1965. It is endemic to New Zealand, typically found in the waters of the northern North Island, in association with Durvillaea (southern bull kelp).

== Description ==
In the original description, Ponder described the species as follows:

Shell of moderate size for genus, smooth, solid, semi-transparent, yellowish-white, broadly-conical, spire about same height as aperture. Whorls 4, rapidly increasing, weakly convex; protoconch smooth, not marked off; sutures false margined; body whorl large, convex. Aperture large, D-shaped, solid; inner lip wide, thick, flanged below; outer lip thickened above, below and slightly in middle portion where it is strongly excavated. Imperforate, but a small slit between inner lip and body whorl due to growth of the former over the latter. Colour pale yellowish-white, aperture white.

Animal: Cephalic tentacles moderately long, slightly tapered, mildly active, colourless; eyes large, on swellings at outer base of tentacles, and beneath transparent shell edge. Snout short, bilobed, pale yellowish; buccal mass orange, yellow in juveniles. Foot long, rounded anteriorly and posteriorly, with a slit from middle of sole to posterior end, posterior mucous gland clearly visible ventrally as a dense white mass, rest of foot semi-transparent white. Opercular lobe white, a very short tentacle sometimes present on the left side. The anatomy is like that of Eatoniella (Pellax) huttoni and E. (D.) olivacea (Ponder—a). The stomach contains fragments of algal material similar to that of the Durvillea holdfast under which the animal lives.
Operculum: D-shaped, curved, columella marginal area wide, transparent, yellowish. Muscle insertion area extensive, pale brown near the columella edge, brownish yellow in central area, yellow near outer edge, white at outer edge. Peg heavy, grooved, curved.

Radula: Typical of the genus. Central 2 + 1 + 2, large. Lateral rather small, elongate, 2 + 1 + 2, with weak dorsal and ventral thickenings. Inner marginal with 6 small cusps, and a small cusp-like process on outer side, rather broad with a short basal process. Outer marginal finely serrate, with a broad base.

E. latebricola measures 1.65 mm (0.065 in) by 1.05 mm (0.041 in). It can be identified due to its shell being broadly conical, yellowish-white, smooth, semi-transparent, solid, and by its white, D-shaped aperture.

== Taxonomy ==
The species was first described by Winston Ponder in 1965, who used the name Eatoniella (Dardanula) latebricola. The modern formatting of the name without a subgenus, Eatoniella albocolumella, was established by Hamish Spencer and Richard C. Willan in 1995. The holotype of the species was collected by Ponder himself on 19 August 1963, under Durvillaea at the southern end of Muriwai on the west coast of the Auckland Region, New Zealand. It is held by the Auckland War Memorial Museum.

== Distribution and habitat ==
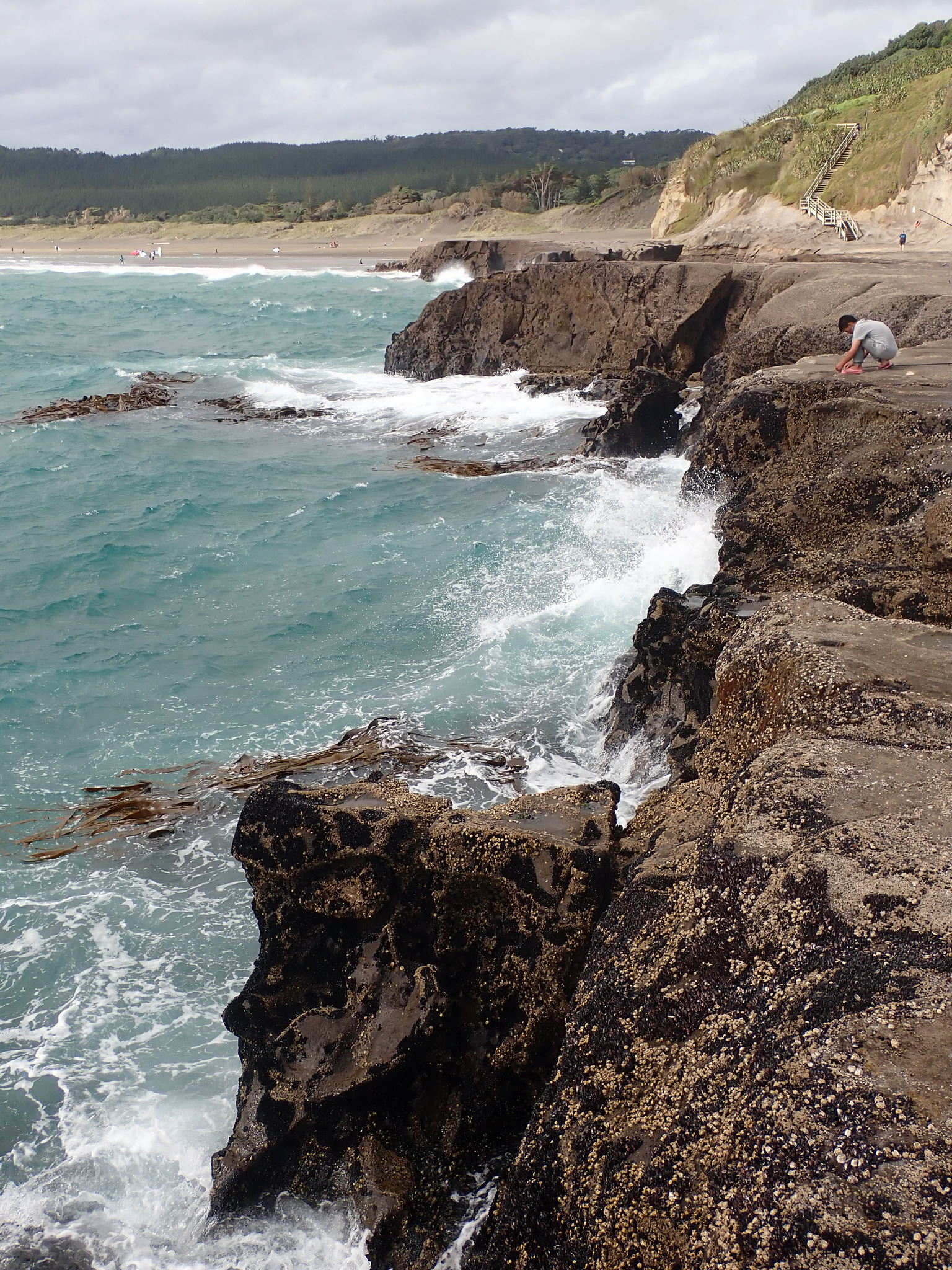
The original holotype was found among Durvillaea kelp at Muriwai beach in West Auckland.

The species is endemic to New Zealand, found in the waters of the North Island, typically in the Northland Region, the Auckland Region (as far south as Piha to the west and Cape Rodney on the east coast), Cuvier Island in the Waikato Region northeast of the Coromandel Peninsula, around Manawatāwhi / Three Kings Islands, and once on the West Coast of the South Island, near Haast.

E. latebricola typically lives on Durvillea seaweed. In 2003, dead specimens of the species were identified on Cuvier Island where Durvillaea is not present. It was theorised that the species might live on algal holdfasts, such as the kelp species Ecklonia radiata.
