= Eatoniella alboelata =

Scientific classification
- Kingdom: Animalia
- Phylum: Mollusca
- Class: Gastropoda
- Subclass: Caenogastropoda
- Order: Littorinimorpha
- Family: Eatoniellidae
- Genus: Eatoniella
- Species: E. alboelata

Binomial name
- Eatoniella alboelata Ponder, 1983

Species of gastropod

Eatoniella alboelata is a species of small sea snail, a marine gastropod mollusk in the family Eatoniellidae, the eatoniellids.
