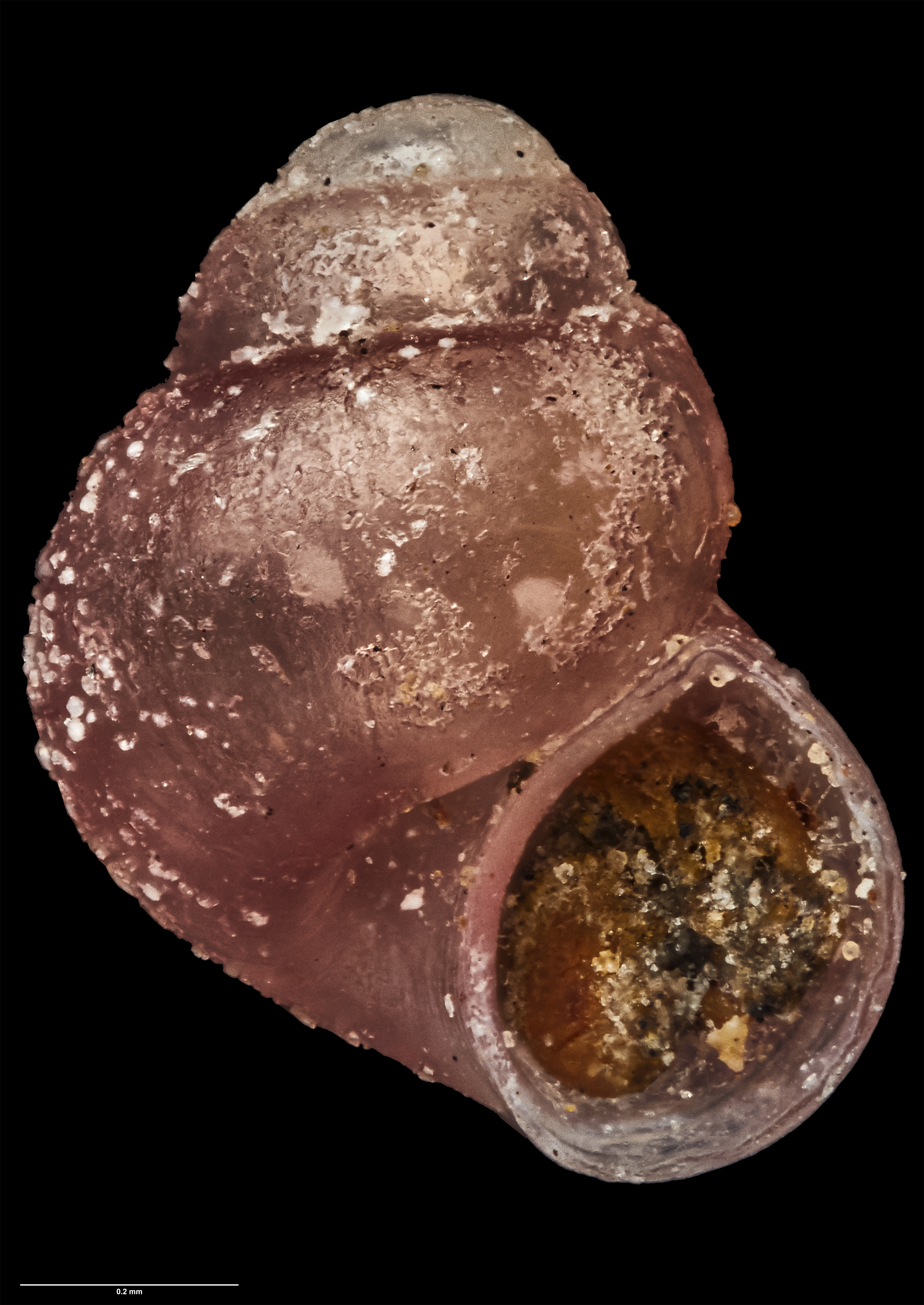
- Holotype of Eatoniella perforata from Auckland War Memorial Museum

Scientific classification
- Domain: Eukaryota
- Kingdom: Animalia
- Phylum: Mollusca
- Class: Gastropoda
- Subclass: Caenogastropoda
- Order: Littorinimorpha
- Family: Eatoniellidae
- Genus: Eatoniella
- Species: E. perforata

Binomial name
- Eatoniella perforata (Ponder, 1965)

Synonyms
- Eatoniella (Caveatoniella) perforata Ponder 1965

= Eatoniella perforata =

Species of gastropod

Eatoniella perforata is a species of marine gastropod mollusc in the family Eatoniellidae. First described by Winston Ponder in 1965, it is endemic to the waters of New Zealand. Compared to most other Eatoniella species of New Zealand, E. perforata is found in relatively deep water.

== Description ==
Eatoniella perforata has a small, white ovate shell, with four and half whorls. The holotype measured 1.25mm by 0.83mm.

== Distribution ==
The species is endemic to New Zealand. The holotype was collected by W. La Roche from Doubtless Bay, Northland Region, from a depth of 22 metres. The mollusc is found to the north-east of the North Island, in moderately deep water, and has also been identified on the Chatham Islands and Auckland Islands.
