= Eatoniella strebeli =

Scientific classification
- Kingdom: Animalia
- Phylum: Mollusca
- Class: Gastropoda
- Subclass: Caenogastropoda
- Order: Littorinimorpha
- Family: Eatoniellidae
- Genus: Eatoniella
- Species: E. strebeli

Binomial name
- Eatoniella strebeli Ponder & Worsfold, 1994

Species of gastropod

Eatoniella strebeli is a species of minute sea snail, a marine gastropod mollusk in the family Eatoniellidae, the eatoniellids.

== Description ==
The maximum recorded shell length is 1.72 mm.

== Habitat ==
Minimum recorded depth is 15 m. Maximum recorded depth is 137 m.
