= Eatoniella kerguelenensis =

Scientific classification
- Kingdom: Animalia
- Phylum: Mollusca
- Class: Gastropoda
- Subclass: Caenogastropoda
- Order: Littorinimorpha
- Family: Eatoniellidae
- Genus: Eatoniella
- Species: E. kerguelenensis

Binomial name
- Eatoniella kerguelenensis (Smith, 1875)

Synonyms
- Eatonia kerguelenensis E. A. Smith, 1875 (original combination); Eatoniella (Eatoniella) kerguelenensis (E. A. Smith, 1875)· accepted, alternate representation; Eatoniella inflata Dall, 1876; Eatoniella kerguelenensis kerguelenensis (E. A. Smith, 1875)· accepted, alternate representation; Eatoniella kerguelensis [sic] (misspelling)

Species of gastropod

Eatoniella kerguelenensis is a species of small sea snail, a marine gastropod mollusk in the family Eatoniellidae, the eatoniellids.

Subspecies

- Eatoniella kerguelenensis chiltoni (Suter, 1909)
- Eatoniella kerguelenensis regularis (E. A. Smith, 1915)

Forma

- Eatoniella kerguelenensis f. contusa Strebel, 1908: synonym of Eatoniella contusa Strebel, 1908 (original combination)
- Eatoniella kerguelenensis f. major Strebel, 1908 : synonym of Eatoniella glacialis (E. A. Smith, 1907)
