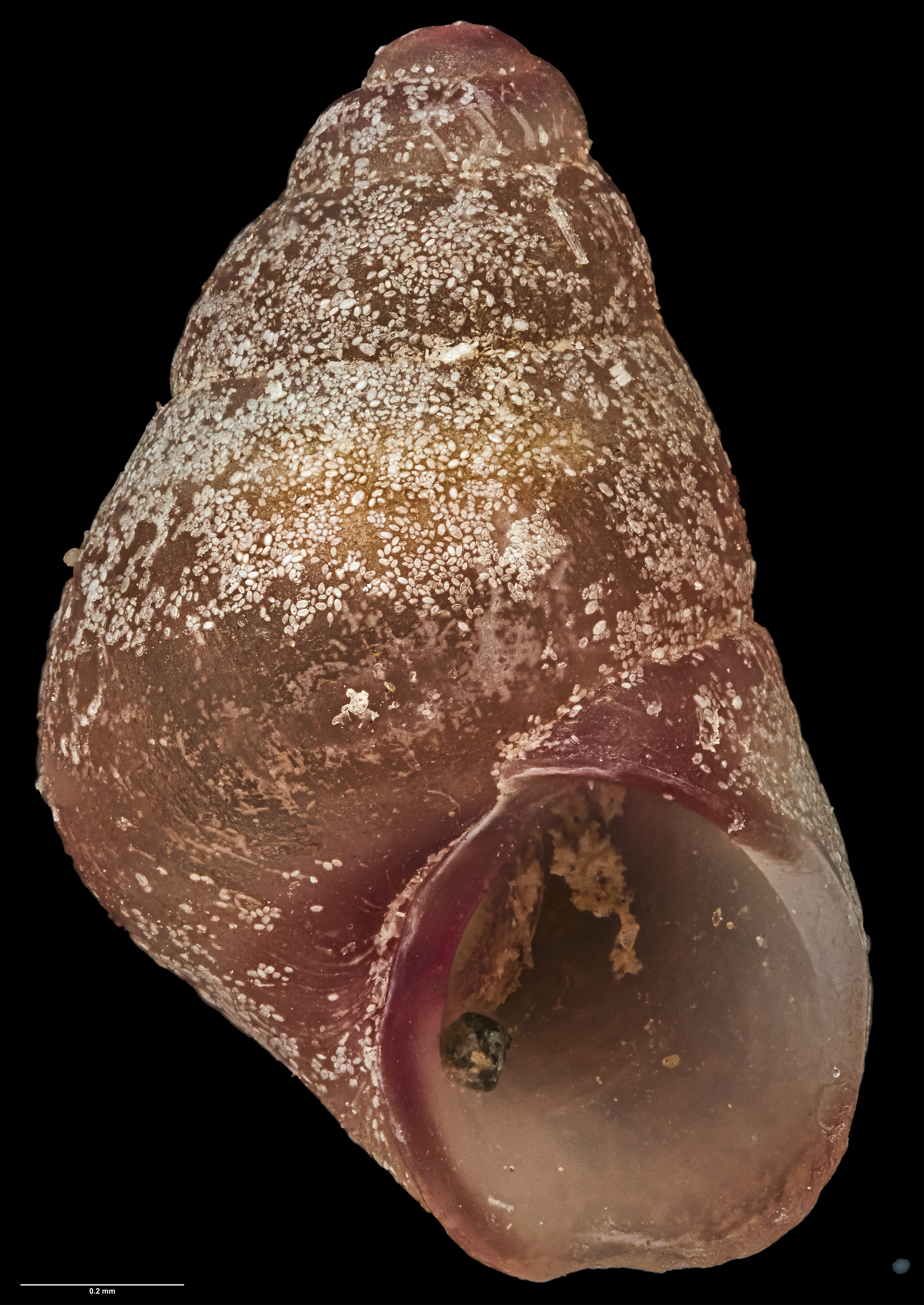
- Holotype of Eatoniella varicolor from Auckland War Memorial Museum

Scientific classification
- Domain: Eukaryota
- Kingdom: Animalia
- Phylum: Mollusca
- Class: Gastropoda
- Subclass: Caenogastropoda
- Order: Littorinimorpha
- Family: Eatoniellidae
- Genus: Eatoniella
- Species: E. varicolor

Binomial name
- Eatoniella varicolor (Ponder, 1965)

Synonyms
- Eatoniella (Dardaniopsis) varicolor Ponder 1965

= Eatoniella varicolor =

Species of gastropod

Eatoniella varicolor is a species of marine gastropod mollusc in the family Eatoniellidae. First described by Winston Ponder in 1965, it is endemic to the waters of New Zealand.

== Description ==
Eatoniella varicolor has an ovate, conic, smooth shell. The shells of this species vary considerably in colour, even within populations. The most commonly seen colour is a pale brownish-yellow, however the shells can vary from dark purple, black, orange, pale yellow and colourless. Shells are also occasionally banded. The species measures 1.73mm by 1.13mm.

The species resembles Eatoniella lutea, which often overlaps in range.Eatoniella varicolor can be distinguished by its smaller size, dark protoconch and thinner shell.

== Distribution and habitat ==
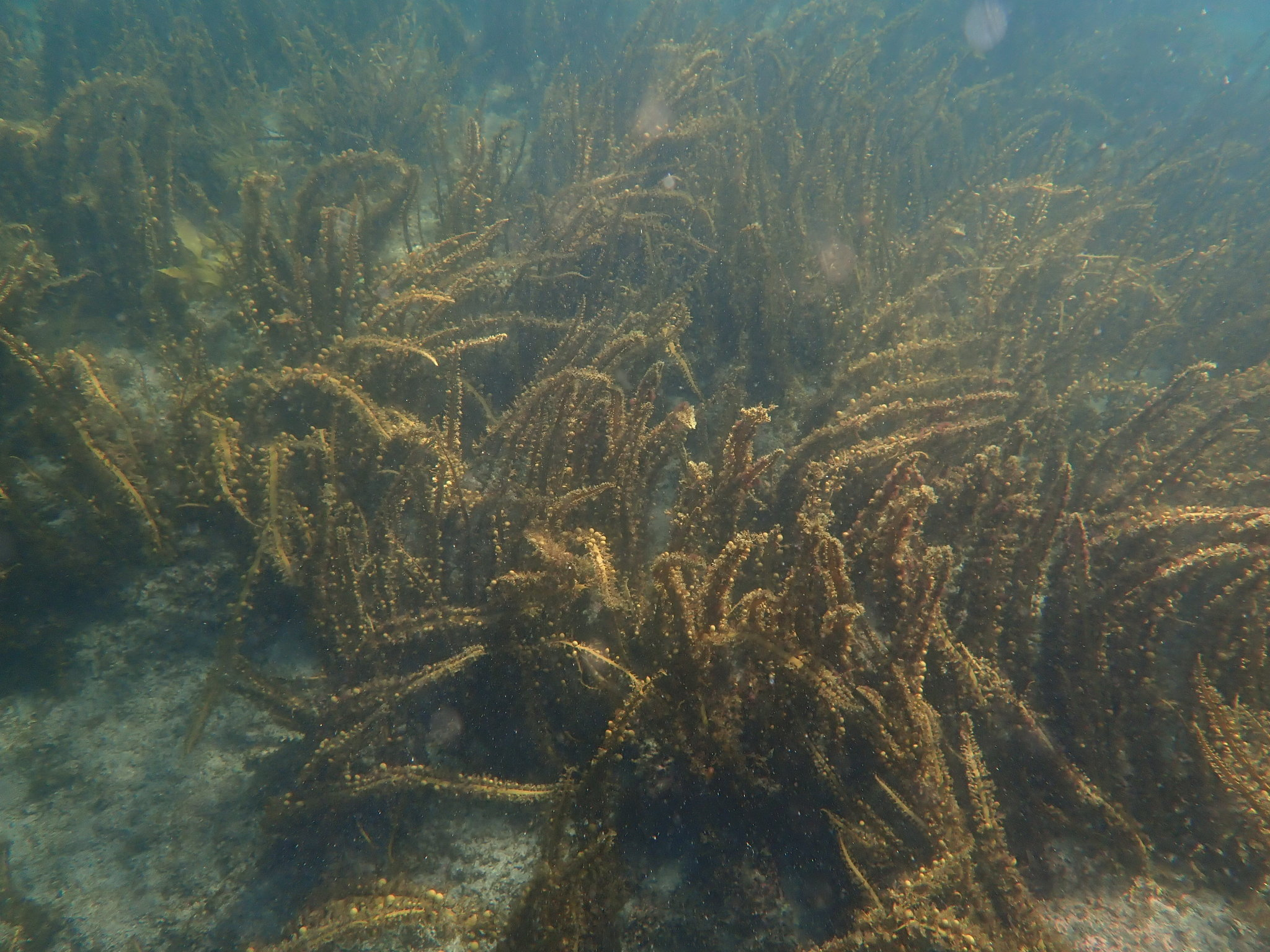
Eatoniella varicolor prefers to live on brown algae such as Carpophyllum plumosum

The species is endemic to New Zealand. The holotype was collected by Ponder himself on 27 March 1963 at Narrow Neck on the North Shore, Auckland, and was found on brown algae in rock pools. Originally the species was described as being found on Stewart Island and the east coasts of the North Island and South Island. Since 1965, the species has been observed on the west coast of the South Island as far north as the Open Bay Islands, and in the Wellington Region as far north as Kapiti Island. The species has also been identified on Manawatāwhi / Three Kings Islands, the volcanic Whakaari / White Island and the Chatham Islands.

The species prefers to live on brown algae, typically Carpophyllum plumosum, however has sometimes been found on Corallina.
