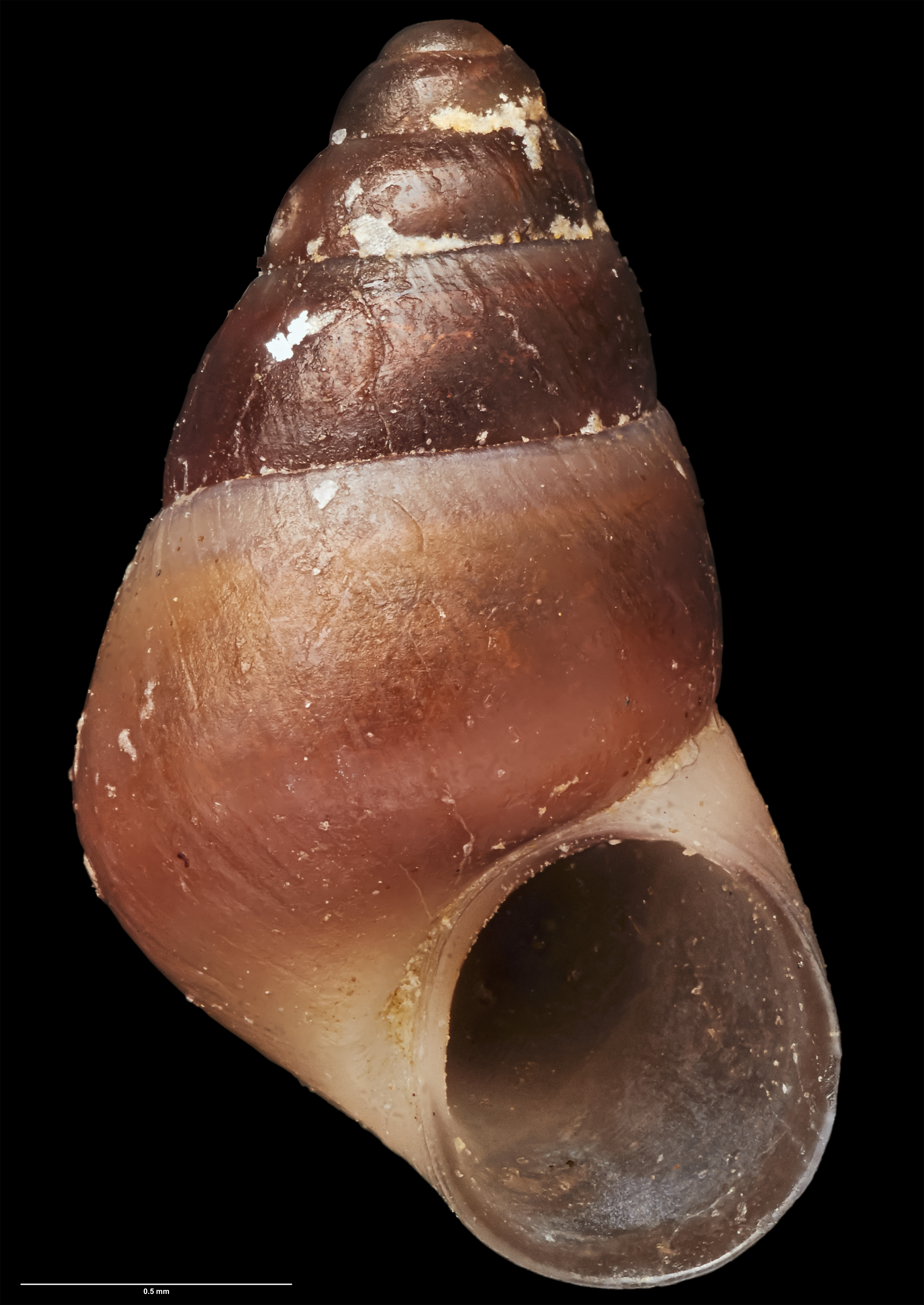
- Holotype of Eatoniella smithae from Auckland War Memorial Museum

Scientific classification
- Domain: Eukaryota
- Kingdom: Animalia
- Phylum: Mollusca
- Class: Gastropoda
- Subclass: Caenogastropoda
- Order: Littorinimorpha
- Family: Eatoniellidae
- Genus: Eatoniella
- Species: E. smithae

Binomial name
- Eatoniella smithae (Ponder, 1965)

Synonyms
- Eatoniella (Dardanula) smithi Ponder 1965

= Eatoniella smithae =

Species of gastropod

Eatoniella smithae is a species of marine gastropod mollusc in the family Eatoniellidae. First described by Winston Ponder in 1965, it is endemic to the waters of New Zealand, and is one of the most common marine species found around Stewart Island.

== Taxonomy ==
The species was first identified as Eatoniella (Dardanula) smithi by Winston Ponder, who named the species after Elsie Smith, an avid collector of Stewart Island eatoniellid shells who collected the holotype. Since identification, the name Eatoniella smithi has been depreciated due to having the incorrect Latin gender ending, and the spelling Eatoniella smithae is now preferred.

== Description ==
Eatoniella smithae has five whorls, with a colour varying from uniformly dark purple-grey to pure white. The holotype measured 2.2mm by 1.3mm.

The species has a similar shell to Eatoniella olivacea, but can be distinguished by its taller length and paler colour.

== Distribution ==
The species is endemic to New Zealand. The holotype was collected in September 1947 by Elsie Smith from Halfmoon Bay, Stewart Island. The species is found around Stewart Island, the lower South Island, Fiordland and the West Coast as far north as Haast. The species has also been identified on the Chatham and the Auckland islands.

It is typically found on low-tide algae, and can thrive in deep water. The species appears to replace Eatoniella olivacea at Stewart Island. The species is one of the most commonly found in the Benthic zone of the coast of Stewart Island.
