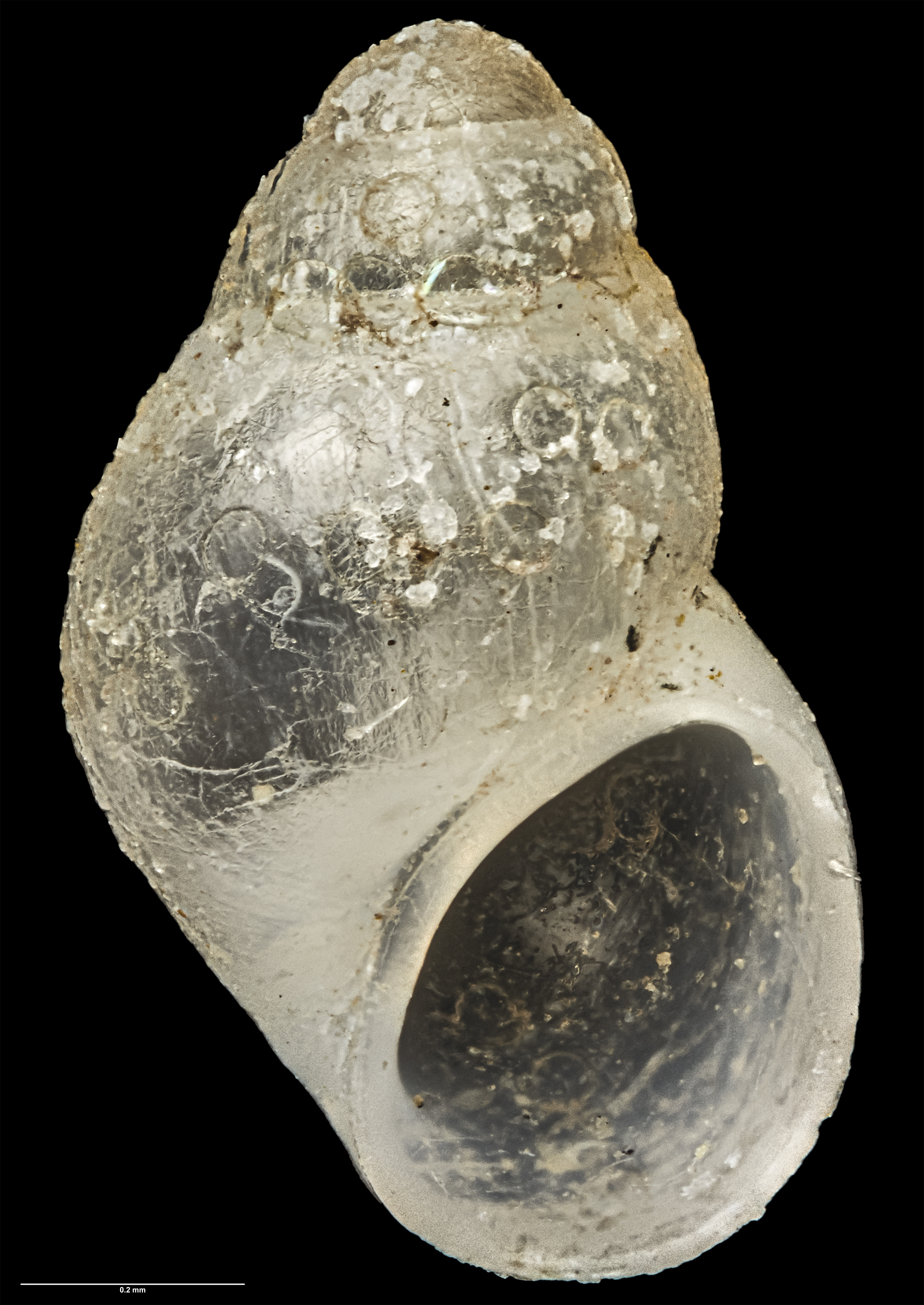
- Holotype of Eatoniella rakiura from Auckland War Memorial Museum

Scientific classification
- Domain: Eukaryota
- Kingdom: Animalia
- Phylum: Mollusca
- Class: Gastropoda
- Subclass: Caenogastropoda
- Order: Littorinimorpha
- Family: Eatoniellidae
- Genus: Eatoniella
- Species: E. rakiura

Binomial name
- Eatoniella rakiura (Ponder, 1965)

Synonyms
- Eatoniella (Albosabula) rakiura Ponder 1965

= Eatoniella rakiura =

Species of gastropod

Eatoniella rakiura is a species of marine gastropod mollusc in the family Eatoniellidae. First described by Winston Ponder in 1965, it is endemic to the waters of New Zealand. The first specimens of the species were exclusively found around Stewart Island.

== Description ==
Eatoniella rakiura has a semi-transparent thin shell, with evenly convex and swollen whorls. The holotype measured 1.1mm by 0.65mm. It is similar in appearance to Eatoniella lampra, but differs in its more swollen whorls.

== Distribution ==
The species is endemic to New Zealand. The holotype was collected on 4 November 1956 at a depth of 46 metres off the coast of Stewart Island, on the surface of bryozoan species. Originally described as occurring exclusively around Steward Island, the species has since been identified at Taieri Mouth in Otago and in the Bounty Islands.
