= Betty Batham =

New Zealand marine biologist and university lecturer

- Born: 2 December 1917; Dunedin
- Died: 8 July 1974; Seatoun
- Education: University of Otago, University of Cambridge
- Occupations: Biologist, marine biologist, botanical collector, scientific collector
- Employer: University of Otago (1950–1974)
- Awards: Fellow of the Royal Society Te Apārangi (1962, 1962); Hamilton Award (1947)

Elizabeth Joan Batham (2 December 1917 – 8 July 1974) was a New Zealand marine biologist and university lecturer. A past president of the New Zealand Marine Sciences Society and a Fellow of the Royal Society of New Zealand, Batham directed the Portobello Marine Biological Station at the University of Otago for more than 23 years.

== Biography ==
Batham was born in Dunedin, New Zealand on 2 December 1917. She graduated from the University of Otago, where she later taught and conducted research. She went to the University of Cambridge for doctoral studies, where she researched the sea anemone and worked as an assistant to zoologist Carl Pantin. In 1947, Batham won the Royal Society of New Zealand's Hamilton Memorial Prize, which recognises outstanding work by an early-career researcher.

In 1951, after the University of Otago took over the fisheries facility that became known as the Portobello Marine Biological Station, Batham was named its director and served there for 23 years. She was made a Fellow of the Royal Society of New Zealand in 1962 and served a term as president of the New Zealand Marine Sciences Society.

In 1952 Batham joined the Second Galathea Expedition as it passed around the south of New Zealand, providing local scientific expertise in exchange for the opportunity to collect specimens from deep water. In 1954 she was a participant in the 1954 Chatham Islands expedition.

Batham began scuba diving later in her career, believing it to be important to her work. Shortly after stepping down from her post at Portobello due to poor health, she disappeared near the shore of Seatoun in July 1974. She is presumed to have drowned in a scuba diving accident.

== Legacy ==
In 2004, the University of Otago Department of Marine Science established the Elizabeth Batham Prize in Marine Science. In 2017, she was selected as one of the Royal Society of New Zealand's "150 women in 150 words".

The ocean glider operated from 2015 onwards by the New Zealand National Institute of Water and Atmospheric Research is named "Betty" in honour of Batham.

In 1965, malacologist Winston Ponder named the gastropod species Eatoniella bathamae after Batham, as thanks for her assistance when Ponder stayed at the Portobello Marine Laboratory.

Batham Way, a residential street on the Otago Peninsula, looks across Broad Bay to the Portobello Marine Laboratory.
