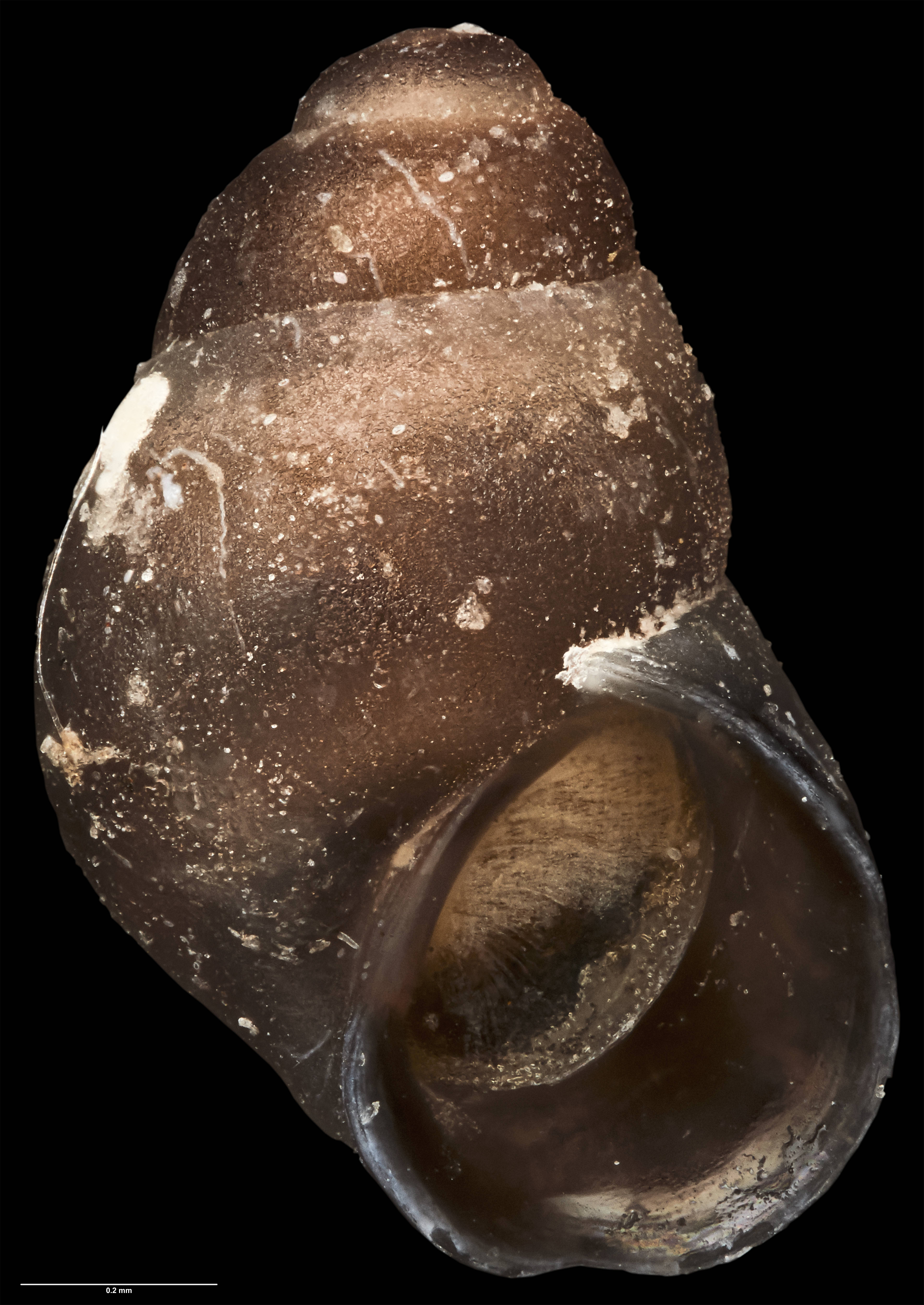
- Holotype of Eatoniella notalabia from Auckland War Memorial Museum

Scientific classification
- Domain: Eukaryota
- Kingdom: Animalia
- Phylum: Mollusca
- Class: Gastropoda
- Subclass: Caenogastropoda
- Order: Littorinimorpha
- Family: Eatoniellidae
- Genus: Eatoniella
- Species: E. notalabia

Binomial name
- Eatoniella notalabia (Ponder, 1965)

Synonyms
- Eatoniella (Dardaniopsis) notalabia (Ponder, 1965); Eatoniella (Eatoniella) notalabia (Ponder, 1965)

= Eatoniella notalabia =

Species of gastropod

Eatoniella notalabia is a species of marine gastropod mollusc in the family Eatoniellidae. It was first described by Winston F. Ponder in 1965. It is endemic to the waters of New Zealand.

== Description ==
Eatoniella notalabia has a minute ovate-conical shell, with a swollen body whorl. Colour of the species' shells can vary from yellow-brown, purplish-brown to black. The species measures 1.26mm by 0.8mm. The animal itself is white-coloured with a narrow strip of black. Specimens collected from Piha in the 1960s were uniformly white, with no black.

== Distribution ==
The species is Endemic to New Zealand. The holotype was collected by Ponder himself on 1 January 1964, at Goat Island Bay (modern-day Cape Rodney-Okakari Point Marine Reserve) in the Auckland Region. The species is found in the waters of the North Island, South Island, Auckland Islands and the Chatham Islands, and is particularly abundant in the South Island and Stewart Island.

The species is found on algae/seaweeds at low tide.
