= Rastodentidae =

Scientific classification
- Kingdom: Animalia
- Phylum: Mollusca
- Class: Gastropoda
- Subclass: Caenogastropoda
- Order: Littorinimorpha
- Superfamily: Cingulopsoidea
- Family: Rastodentidae; Ponder, 1966

Genera
- See text

Family of gastropods

Rastodentidae is a taxonomic family of minute sea snails, marine gastropod molluscs in the clade Littorinimorpha.

According to the taxonomy of the Gastropoda by Bouchet & Rocroi (2005) the family Rastodentidae has no subfamilies.

== Genera ==
Genera within the family Rastodentidae include:

- Rastodens Ponder, 1966
- Tridentifera Ponder, 1966
