= Eatoniella subgoniostoma =

Scientific classification
- Kingdom: Animalia
- Phylum: Mollusca
- Class: Gastropoda
- Subclass: Caenogastropoda
- Order: Littorinimorpha
- Family: Eatoniellidae
- Genus: Eatoniella
- Species: E. subgoniostoma

Binomial name
- Eatoniella subgoniostoma Strebel, 1908

Species of gastropod

Eatoniella subgoniostoma is a species of small sea snail, a marine gastropod mollusk in the family Eatoniellidae, the eatoniellids
