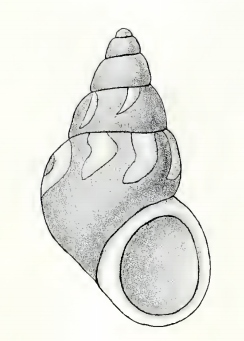
- Drawing of a shell of Eatoniella flammulata

Scientific classification
- Kingdom: Animalia
- Phylum: Mollusca
- Class: Gastropoda
- Subclass: Caenogastropoda
- Order: Littorinimorpha
- Family: Eatoniellidae
- Genus: Eatoniella; Dall, 1876

Type species
- Eatonia kerguelenensis E.A. Smith, 1875

Synonyms
- Cerostraca Iredale, 1915; Dardania Hutton, 1882 (invalid: junior homonym of Dardania Stål, 1866 [Insecta]; Dardanula Iredale, 1915 is a replacement name); Dardaniopsis Ponder, 1965; Dardanula Iredale, 1915; Eatonia E.A. Smith, 1875 (invalid: junior homonym of Eatonia Hall, 1858; Eatoniella is a replacement name); Eatoniella (Abscindostoma) Ponder, 1965; Eatoniella (Albitoniella) Ponder, 1965; Eatoniella (Albosabula) Ponder, 1965 · accepted, alternate representation; Eatoniella (Caveatoniella) Ponder, 1965· accepted, alternate representation; Eatoniella (Cerostraca) W. R. B. Oliver, 1915; Eatoniella (Dardaniopsis) Ponder, 1965; Eatoniella (Dardanula) Iredale, 1915; Eatoniella (Eatoniella) Dall, 1876 · accepted, alternate representation; Eatoniella (Pellax) Finlay, 1926; Pellax Finlay, 1926; Rissoina (Eatoniella) Dall, 1876

= Eatoniella =

Genus of gastropods

Eatoniella is a genus of minute sea snails, marine gastropod mollusks in the family Eatoniellidae, the eatoniellids.

== Species ==
Species within the genus Eatoniella include:

- Eatoniella afronigra Ponder & Worsfold, 1994
- Eatoniella ainsworthi (Hedley, 1916)
- Eatoniella albocolumella Ponder, 1965
- Eatoniella alboelata Ponder, 1983
- Eatoniella algoensis (Thiele, 1925)
- Eatoniella ansonae Ponder & Yoo, 1978
- Eatoniella argentinensis Castellanos & Fernández, 1972
- Eatoniella atervisceralis Ponder, 1965
- Eatoniella atrella Ponder & Yoo, 1978
- Eatoniella atropurpurea (Frauenfeld, 1867)
- Eatoniella australiensis (Thiele, 1930)
- Eatoniella bathamae Ponder, 1965
- Eatoniella bennetti (Preston, 1912)
- Eatoniella caliginosa (Smith, 1875)
- Eatoniella cana Ponder, 1983
- Eatoniella capensis Thiele, 1912
- Eatoniella castanea Ponder & Worsfold, 1994
- Eatoniella contusa Ponder, 1983
- Eatoniella delli Ponder, 1965
- Eatoniella demissa (Smith, 1915)
- Eatoniella denticula Ponder & Worsfold, 1994
- Eatoniella depressa Ponder & Yoo, 1978
- Eatoniella dilatata (Powell, 1955)
- Eatoniella duperrei (Vélain, 1877)
- Eatoniella ebenina Ponder & Worsfold, 1994
- Eatoniella exigua Ponder & Yoo, 1978
- Eatoniella flammulata (Hutton, 1878)
- Eatoniella fossa Ponder, 1965
- Eatoniella fulva Ponder & Yoo, 1978
- Eatoniella fuscosubucula Ponder, 1965
- Eatoniella galbinia (Laseron, 1950)
- Eatoniella georgiana (Pfeffer, 1886) (nomen dubium)
- Eatoniella glacialis (Smith, 1907)
- Eatoniella globosa Ponder, 1965
- Eatoniella glomerosa Ponder & Worsfold, 1994
- Eatoniella helga (Bartsch, 1915)
- Eatoniella hewittae Ponder & Yoo, 1978
- Eatoniella howensis Ponder & Yoo, 1978
- Eatoniella hyalina Thiele, 1912
- † Eatoniella insueta (Laws, 1950)
- Eatoniella iredalei (Oliver, 1915)
- Eatoniella janetaylorae Kay, 1979
- Eatoniella juliae Ponder & Yoo, 1978
- Eatoniella kerguelenensis (Smith, 1875)
- † Eatoniella laevicordata (Laws, 1940)
- Eatoniella lampra (Suter, 1908)
- Eatoniella latebricola Ponder, 1965
- Eatoniella limbata (Hutton, 1883)
- Eatoniella lineata Worsfold, Avern & Ponder, 1993
- Eatoniella lutea (Suter, 1908)
- Eatoniella mcleani Ponder & Worsfold, 1994
- Eatoniella melanochroma (Tate, 1899)
- Eatoniella minima (Thiele, 1925)
- Eatoniella mortoni Ponder, 1965
- Eatoniella nigra (d'Orbigny, 1841)
- Eatoniella notalabia Ponder, 1965
- Eatoniella notalbula Ponder, 1965
- Eatoniella notata Ponder & Yoo, 1977
- Eatoniella obtusispira (Powell, 1955)
- Eatoniella occulta Ponder, 1983
- Eatoniella olivacea (Hutton, 1882)
- Eatoniella pallida (Powell, 1937)
- Eatoniella pellucida (Tate & May, 1900)
- Eatoniella perforata Ponder, 1965
- Eatoniella pfefferi (Suter, 1909)
- Eatoniella picea Ponder & Worsfold, 1994
- Eatoniella pigmenta Kay, 1979
- Eatoniella poutama (E. C. Smith, 1962)
- † Eatoniella praecursor (Laws, 1939)
- Eatoniella prestoni Ponder & Yoo, 1978
- Eatoniella pullmitra Ponder, 1965
- Eatoniella puniceolinea Ponder & Yoo, 1978
- Eatoniella puniceomacer Ponder, 1965
- Eatoniella rakiura Ponder, 1965
- † Eatoniella rivertonensis (Finlay, 1924)
- Eatoniella roseocincta (Suter, 1908)
- Eatoniella roseola (Iredale, 1915)
- Eatoniella roseospira (Powell, 1937)
- † Eatoniella sedicula (Laws, 1941)
- Eatoniella shepherdi Ponder & Yoo, 1978
- Eatoniella smithae Ponder, 1965
- Eatoniella stewartiana Ponder, 1965
- Eatoniella strebeli Ponder & Worsfold, 1994
- † Eatoniella subexcavata (Laws, 1941)
- Eatoniella subgoniostoma Strebel, 1908
- Eatoniella subrufescens (E. A. Smith, 1875)
- Eatoniella talboti Ponder & Yoo, 1978
- Eatoniella taylorae Ponder & Yoo, 1978
- Eatoniella tenella (Powell, 1937)
- Eatoniella thalia (Bartsch, 1915)
- Eatoniella tristanensis Worsfold, Avern & Ponder, 1993
- Eatoniella trochiformis Worsfold, Avern & Ponder, 1993
- Eatoniella turricula Ponder & Worsfold, 1994
- Eatoniella varicifera Ponder, 1983
- Eatoniella varicolor Ponder, 1965
- Eatoniella verecunda (Suter, 1908)
- Eatoniella victoriae Ponder & Yoo, 1978
- Eatoniella zigzag Ponder & Worsfold, 1994

Species brought into synonymy

- Eatoniella huttoni (Pilsbry, 1888): synonym of Eatoniella flammulata (Hutton, 1878)
- Eatoniella kerguelensis [sic]: synonym of Eatoniella kerguelenensis (E. A. Smith, 1875)
- Eatoniella maculosa Ponder, 1965: synonym of Eatoniella notata Ponder & Yoo, 1977
- Eatoniella nigra (Krauss, 1848): synonym of Eatoniella afronigra Ponder & Worsfold, 1994
- Eatoniella paludinoides E. A. Smith, 1902: synonym of Skenella paludinoides (E. A. Smith, 1902)
- Eatoniella pusilla Thiele, 1912 : synonym of Eatonina pusilla (Thiele, 1912)
- Eatoniella rubrooperculata Castellanos & Fernández, 1972: synonym of Barleeia rubrooperculata (Castellanos & Fernández, 1972)
- Eatoniella thola Ponder, 1965: synonym of Crassitoniella thola (Ponder, 1965)
