= Eatoniella demissa =

Scientific classification
- Kingdom: Animalia
- Phylum: Mollusca
- Class: Gastropoda
- Subclass: Caenogastropoda
- Order: Littorinimorpha
- Family: Eatoniellidae
- Genus: Eatoniella
- Species: E. demissa

Binomial name
- Eatoniella demissa (Smith, 1915)

Species of gastropod

Eatoniella demissa is a species of small sea snail, a marine gastropod mollusk in the family Eatoniellidae, the eatoniellids.

== Description ==
The species is endemic to the King Haakon VII Sea and Davis Sea of Antarctica.
