= Eatoniella caliginosa =

Scientific classification
- Kingdom: Animalia
- Phylum: Mollusca
- Class: Gastropoda
- Subclass: Caenogastropoda
- Order: Littorinimorpha
- Family: Eatoniellidae
- Genus: Eatoniella
- Species: E. caliginosa

Binomial name
- Eatoniella caliginosa (Smith, 1875)

Species of gastropod

Eatoniella caliginosa is a species of small sea snail, a marine gastropod mollusk in the family Eatoniellidae, the eatoniellids.

== Distribution ==
The species is endemic to the Kerguelen Islands.

== Description ==
The maximum recorded shell length is 2.24 mm.

== Habitat ==
Minimum recorded depth is 0 m. Maximum recorded depth is 41 m.
