= Hamish Spencer =

New Zealand evolutionary biologist

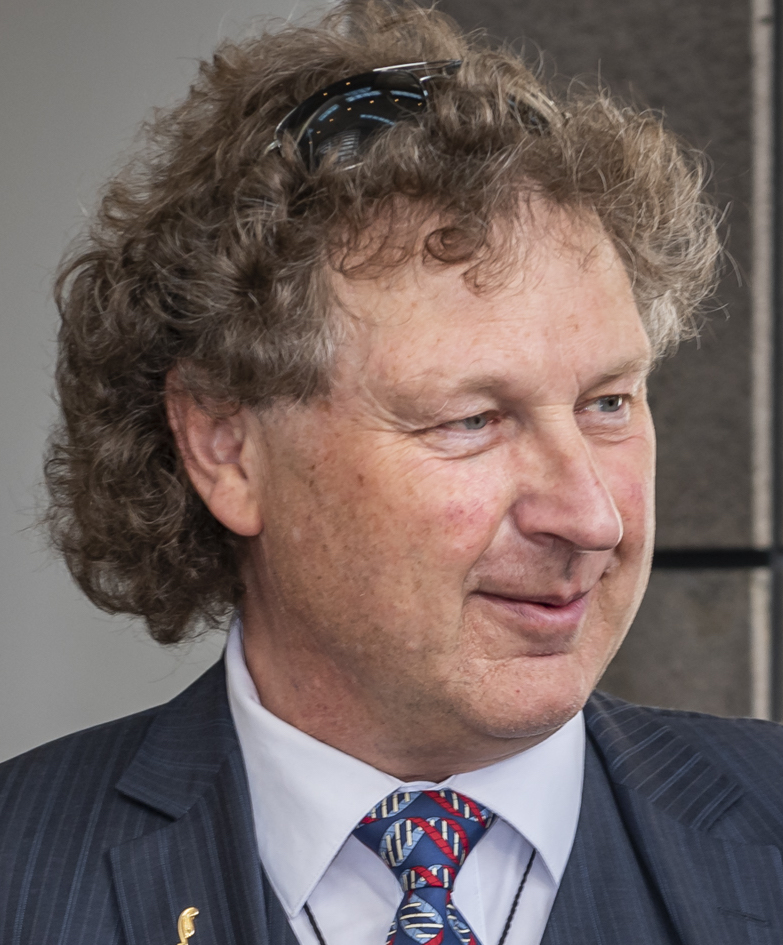
- Spencer in 2020
- Awards: Fellow of the Royal Society Te Apārangi, Callaghan Medal, University of Otago Sesquicentennial Distinguished Chair, James Cook Research Fellowship, Fellow of the International Science Council

Academic background
- Education: University of Auckland, University of Auckland, Harvard University
- Thesis: An investigation of the theories of speciation by founder effect (1988)
- Doctoral advisor: Richard Lewontin

Academic work
- Institutions: University of Waikato, University of Otago, Ministry of Business, Innovation and Employment
- Doctoral students: Jemma Geoghegan

Hamish Gordon Spencer FRSNZ is a New Zealand evolutionary biologist, and is a Distinguished Professor at the University of Otago. Spencer was elected a Fellow of the Royal Society Te Apārangi in 2009, and is a Fellow of the International Science Council. He won the Callaghan Medal in 2016.

== Academic career ==
Spencer completed a PhD at Harvard University in 1988, under the supervision of Richard Lewontin. Spencer joined the faculty of the Department of Zoology at the University of Otago in 1992, rising to full professor in 2006. He was appointed one of seven University of Otago Sesquicentennial Distinguished Chairs in 2019.

Spencer was director of the Allan Wilson Centre of Research Excellence for three years from 2012. He was an independent science advisor to the Ministry of Business, Innovation and Employment for five years, beginning in 2016. Spencer led the bid to hold the International Congress of History of Science and Technology in New Zealand in 2025.

Spencer is an evolutionary biologist, who uses mathematical models and genetics to explore the evolution and diversity of organisms, particularly New Zealand biota. He has worked on frequency-dependent selection and evolutionary developmental biology, and is an expert on New Zealand's molluscan fauna. He is also interested in the history of science, and has written about the history of eugenics and society's attitudes to cousin marriage. Notable students of Spencer include Jemma Geoghegan.

== Honours and awards ==
Spencer was elected a Fellow of the Royal Society Te Apārangi in 2009. In 2016 he was awarded the Royal Society's Callaghan Medal, for ''bringing ecological science into the marae and community''. In 2022 he was awarded a James Cook Research Fellowship. He has been a Fellow of the International Science Council since 2023.

The deepwater snail Hortia spenceri is named after Spencer.

== Personal life ==
Spencer is married to marine biogeochemist Abigail Smith.

== Selected works ==
- Bateson, Patrick; Barker, David; Timothy Clutton-Brock; et al. (2004). "Developmental plasticity and human health". Nature. 430 (6998): 419–421. doi:10.1038/nature02725. PMID 15269759. Wikidata Q52088515.
- Gluckman, Peter David; Hanson, Mark Adrian; Spencer, Hamish Gordon (2005). "Predictive adaptive responses and human evolution". Trends in Ecology & Evolution. 20 (10): 527–533. doi:10.1016/j.tree.2005.08.001. PMID 16701430. Wikidata Q61693832.
- Sultan, Sonia; Spencer, Hamish Gordon (2002). "Metapopulation structure favors plasticity over local adaptation". The American Naturalist. 160 (2): 271–283. doi:10.1086/341015. PMID 18707492. Wikidata Q61693848.
- Morison, Ian M.; Joshua P Ramsay; Spencer, Hamish Gordon (2005). "A census of mammalian imprinting". Trends in Genetics. 21 (8): 457–465. doi:10.1016/j.tig.2005.06.008. PMID 15990197. Wikidata Q34430259.
- Gluckman, Peter David; Hanson, Mark Adrian; Spencer, Hamish Gordon; Bateson, Patrick (2005). "Environmental influences during development and their later consequences for health and disease: implications for the interpretation of empirical studies". Proceedings of the Royal Society B. 272 (1564): 671–677. doi:10.1098/rspb.2004.3001. PMC 1602053. PMID 15870029. Wikidata Q52564078.
- Fraser, Ceridwen; Raisa Nikula; Spencer, Hamish Gordon; Waters, Jonathan Michael (2009). "Kelp genes reveal effects of subantarctic sea ice during the Last Glacial Maximum". Proceedings of the National Academy of Sciences of the United States of America. 106 (9): 3249–3253. Bibcode:2009PNAS..106.3249F. doi:10.1073/pnas.0810635106. PMC 2651250. PMID 19204277. Wikidata Q37117560.
