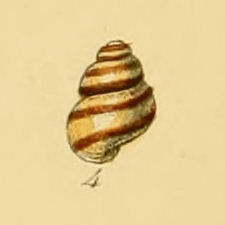
- Eatonina fulgida shell

Scientific classification
- Domain: Eukaryota
- Kingdom: Animalia
- Phylum: Mollusca
- Class: Gastropoda
- Subclass: Caenogastropoda
- Order: Littorinimorpha
- Superfamily: Cingulopsoidea; Fretter & Patil, 1958

Families
- See text

= Cingulopsoidea =

Superfamily of gastropods

The Cingulopsoidea is a superfamily of sea snails, marine gastropod molluscs in the clade Littorinimorpha.

== Families ==
The following three families have been recognized in the taxonomy of Bouchet & Rocroi (2005):

- Family Cingulopsidae Fretter & Patil, 1958
- Family Eatoniellidae Ponder, 1965
- Family Rastodentidae Ponder, 1966

Synonyms

- Coriandriidae F. Nordsieck, 1972: synonym of Cingulopsidae Fretter & Patil, 1958
- Eatoninidae Golikov & Starobogatov, 1975: synonym of Cingulopsidae Fretter & Patil, 1958

This taxonomy is based on the study by V. Fretter and A. M. Patil, published in 1958.
