= Winston Ponder =

New Zealand/Australian zoologist and malacologist

- Born: 1941 (age 83–84)
- Education: Doctor of Philosophy
- Alma mater: University of Auckland
- Employer: Australian Museum
- Awards: Clarke Medal (2010); Hamilton Award (1968); Member of the Order of Australia (For significant service to scientific research, particularly invertebrate and conservation biology., Dr Winston Frank Ponder, 2024)

Winston Frank Ponder AM (born 1941) is a malacologist born and educated in New Zealand who has named and described many marine and freshwater animals, especially micromolluscs.

== Education and career ==
Ponder graduated with an MSc, PhD (1968) and DSc from the University of Auckland, New Zealand. He completed his Ph.D while working at the Dominion Museum but by 1969 he had taken a position at the Australian Museum, where he has remained.

Ponder was the principal research scientist in the malacology section of the Australian Museum, Sydney, Australia and helped to build up the museum's mollusc collection so that it became one of the most extensive of its kind in the world. Ponder retired from this post after a long career of more than forty years of research on molluscs, and is now an Honorary Fellow of the museum.

He has been the president of the Society of Australian Systematic Biologists, and was the managing editor of the journal Molluscan Research of the Malacological Society of Australasia. for 8 years.

Early in his career, in 1964, he worked on Antarctic collections together with Richard Dell and Alan Beu, resulting in a major monograph on the Antarctic bivalves, chitons and scaphopods.

Ponder is the author of more than 300 research publications. Many of these are on the subjects of the freshwater molluscs of Australia, and on invertebrate conservation. One major contribution was a taxonomy of the Gastropoda, which he published together with David R. Lindberg in 1997. This was the last major publication on the taxonomy of the Gastropoda that was based on the morphology of snails and slugs (their internal and external shapes and forms), and did not take into account any analysis of their DNA or RNA.

In 2008, again with David Lindberg, he edited the book "Phylogeny and Evolution of the Mollusca" in which 36 experts provided an up-to-date review on the evolutionary history of the Mollusca, based on reinvestigation of morphological characters, molecular data and the fossil record.

== Honours ==
In 2008 Ponder received the Australian Marine Sciences Association Silver Jubilee Award for a lifetime of achievement in research on marine molluscs.

In 2009 he was awarded the Clarke Medal in recognition of his Zoological work by the Royal Society of New South Wales.

Ponder was appointed a Member of the Order of Australia in the 2024 King's Birthday Honours for "significant service to scientific research, particularly invertebrate and conservation biology".

== Some Gastropod taxa named by Ponder ==
His zoological author abbreviation is Ponder. He has authored over 500 taxa.

=== Higher taxa ===
- Subclass Eogastropoda Ponder & Lindberg, 1997
- Order Sorbeoconcha Ponder & Lindberg, 1997
- Suborder Hypsogastropoda Ponder & Lindberg, 1997

=== Superfamilies ===
- Superfamily Glacidorboidea Ponder, 1986

=== Families ===
- Eatoniellidae Ponder, 1965
- Rastodentidae Ponder, 1966
- Elachisinidae Ponder, 1985
- Emblandidae Ponder, 1985
- Epigridae Ponder, 1985
- Amathinidae Ponder, 1987
- Calopiidae Ponder, 1999

=== Subfamilies ===
- Subfamily Pelycidiinae Ponder & Hall, 1983

=== Genera ===
- Microestea Ponder, 1965
- Rufodardanula Ponder, 1965
- Rastodens Ponder, 1966
- Rissolitorina Ponder, 1966
- Tridentifera Ponder, 1966
- Fictonoba Ponder, 1967
- Pseudodiala Ponder, 1967
- Pseudestea Ponder, 1967
- Pseudoskenella Ponder, 1973
- Lirobarleeia Ponder, 1983
- Kutikina Ponder & Waterhouse, 1997
- Kessneria Walker & Ponder, 2001

== Taxa named after Ponder ==
=== Genera ===
- Ponderia Hoaurt, 1986
- Ponderconcha Clark, 2009

=== Species in temporal order ===
- Aspella ponderi Radwin & D' Attilio, 1976
- Heliacus cerdaleus ponderi Garrard, 1977
- Limatula (Stabilima) ponderi Fleming, 1978
- Echineulima ponderi Warén, 1980
- Pisinna ponderi Palazzi, 1982
- Notocrater ponderi B. A. Marshall, 1986
- Oliva (Miniaceoliva) caerulea ponderi Petuch & Sargent, 1986
- Sassia (Sassia) ponderi Beu, 1986
- Tritonoharpa ponderi Beu & Maxwell, 1987
- Favartia (Favartia) ponderi Myers & d'Attilio, 1989
- Amalda (Alcospira) ponderi Ninomiya, 1991
- Choristella ponderi McLean, 1992
- Austrotrochaclis ponderi B. A. Marshall, 1995
- Powellisetia ponderi Numanami, 1996
- Fissidentalium ponderi Lamprell & Healy, 1998
- Posticobia ponderi Clark, 2009
- Amplirhagada ponderi Köhler, 2010

== Publications ==
- Ponder W. F. & A. Warén (1988). "Classification of the Caenogastropoda and Heterostropha - A list of the family-group names and higher taxa". Malacological Review. Supll. (4): 288–328.
- Clark S. A., Miller A. C. & Ponder W. F. (2003) Revision of the snail genus Austropyrgus (Gastropoda: Hydrobiidae). 109 pp.
- Ponder, W. F. (4 July 2003). "Monograph of the Australian Bithyniidae (Caenogastropoda: Rissooidea)" (PDF). Zootaxa. 230: 1–126. doi:10.11646/zootaxa.230.1.1. - There are 17 newly described species from the genus Gabbia.
- Colgan D. J., Ponder W. F., Beacham E. & Macaranas J. (2006). "Molecular phylogenetics of Caenogastropoda (Gastropoda: Mollusca)". Molecular Phylogenetics and Evolution 42(3): 717–737. doi:10.1016/j.ympev.2006.10.009 PDF
- Ponder W. & Lindberg D. R. (2008). Phylogeny and Evolution of the Mollusca. University of California Press, 469 pp. ISBN 978-0-520-25092-5.

== See also ==
- Taxonomy of the Gastropoda (Ponder & Lindberg, 1997)
- Taxa named by Winston Ponder
