= Notosetia =

Scientific classification
- Kingdom: Animalia
- Phylum: Mollusca
- Class: Gastropoda
- Subclass: Vetigastropoda
- Family: incertae sedis
- Genus: Notosetia; Iredale, 1915

Type species
- Barleeia neozelanica Suter, 1908

Species
- See text

Genus of gastropods

Notosetia is a genus of minute sea snails or micromolluscs, marine gastropod molluscs.

== Species ==
- Notosetia aoteana Powell, 1937
- Notosetia neozelanica Suter, 1898
- Notosaria nigricans Sowerby, 1846
- Notosaria reinga Lee & Wilson, 1979

Species brought into synonymy

- Notosetia electra W. R. B. Oliver, 1915: synonym of Rastodens electra (W. R. B. Oliver, 1915)
- Notosetia foveauxana E. C. Smith, 1962: synonym of Powellisetia subtenuis (Powell, 1937)
- Notosetia fulva Laseron, 1950: synonym of Rissoella micra (Finlay, 1924)
- Notosetia ghanensis Rolán & Ryall, 2000: synonym of Ponderinella ghanensis (Rolán & Ryall, 2000)
- Notosetia infecta (Suter, 1908): synonym of Pusillina (Haurakia) infecta (Suter, 1908): synonym of Haurakia infecta (Suter, 1908)
- Notosetia lineata (Smith, E. C., 1962): synonym of Powellisetia lineata (E. C. Smith, 1962)
- Notosetia pellucida Laseron, 1950: synonym of Rissoella secunda (Iredale, 1912)
- Notosetia ponderi: synonym of Powellisetia ponderi Numanami, 1996
- Notosetia porcellana : synonym of Powellisetia porcellana (Suter, 1908)
- Notosetia pupinella Finlay, 1927: synonym of Pupatonia pupinella (Finlay, 1927)
- Notosetia retusa Powell, 1927: synonym of Powellisetia retusa (Powell, 1927)
- Notosetia unicarinata Powell, 1930: synonym of Powellisetia unicarinata (Powell, 1930)
- Notosetia castanea Laseron, 1950
- Notosetia fairchildi Powell, 1933
- Notosetia foveauxana Smith, E. C., 1962
- Notosetia nitens
