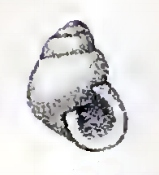
- Drawing with an apertural view of Putilla lucida

Scientific classification
- Kingdom: Animalia
- Phylum: Mollusca
- Class: Gastropoda
- Subclass: Vetigastropoda
- Family: Seguenziidae
- Subfamily: Davisianinae
- Genus: Putilla; A. Adams, 1867

Type species
- Putilla lucida A. Adams, 1867

Synonyms
- Notosetia Iredale, 1915

= Putilla =

Genus of gastropods

Putilla is a genus of sea snails, marine gastropod mollusks in the family Seguenziidae.

== Species ==
Species within the genus Putilla include:

- Putilla lacuna (Laseron, 1954)
- Putilla lucida A. Adams, 1867
- † Putilla ponderi (Maxwell, 1992)
- Putilla porcellana (Tate & May, 1900)
- † Putilla tantilla (Laws, 1936)

Species brought into synonymy

- Putilla abyssicola Nordsieck, 1972: synonym of Benthonella tenella (Jeffreys, 1869)
- Putilla aoteana (Powell, 1937): synonym of Notosetia aoteana Powell, 1937
- Putilla cantrainei Nordsieck, 1972: synonym of Obtusella intersecta (S. Wood, 1857)
- Putilla messanensis (Aradas & Benoit, 1876): synonym of Rissoa messanensis Aradas & Benoit, 1876
- Putilla neozelanica (Suter, 1908): synonym of Notosetia neozelanica (Suter, 1898)
