= Pupatonia magellanica =

Scientific classification
- Kingdom: Animalia
- Phylum: Mollusca
- Class: Gastropoda
- Subclass: Caenogastropoda
- Order: Littorinimorpha
- Family: Eatoniellidae
- Genus: Pupatonia
- Species: P. magellanica

Binomial name
- Pupatonia magellanica Ponder & Worsfold, 1994

Species of Pupatonia

Pupatonia magellanica is a species in the genus Pupatonia.
