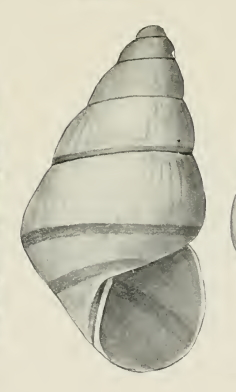
- Shell of Crassitoniella erratica

Scientific classification
- Kingdom: Animalia
- Phylum: Mollusca
- Class: Gastropoda
- Subclass: Caenogastropoda
- Order: Littorinimorpha
- Superfamily: Cingulopsoidea
- Family: Eatoniellidae
- Genus: Crassitoniella
- Species: C. erratica

Binomial name
- Crassitoniella erratica Ponder, 1965

Synonyms
- Amphithalamus aurantiocinctus May, 1915 junior subjective synonym; Amphithalamus erratica May, 1913 (original combination); Amphithalimus erratica May, 1913 (basionym, misspelled genus)

= Crassitoniella erratica =

Species of sea snail

Crassitoniella erratica is a species of sea snail in the genus Crassitoniella.

Subspecies

- Crassitoniella erratica erratica (May, 1913)
- † Crassitoniella erratica subbicolor (Ludbrook, 1956)

== Description ==
The length of the shell attains 2.5 mm, its diameter 1.4 mm.

(Original description as Amphithalamus aurantiocinctus) The shell is small, narrowly pyramidal, and white, adorned with two orange bands. It features five rounded whorls and a well-impressed, faintly axially costate suture; the first three whorls and the base are smooth. A narrow orange band is present at the periphery, which just shows above the suture on the spire; a second band is located on the middle of the base. The aperture is roughly quadrangular. The columella is straight and upright; behind it, an umbilical chink is present. The outer lip is sharp; the front lip bends back towards the axis of the shell.

== Distribution ==
This species is endemic to Australia and occurs off Tasmania.
