= Pupatonia atoma =

Scientific classification
- Kingdom: Animalia
- Phylum: Mollusca
- Class: Gastropoda
- Subclass: Caenogastropoda
- Order: Littorinimorpha
- Superfamily: Cingulopsoidea
- Family: Eatoniellidae
- Genus: Pupatonia
- Species: P. atoma

Binomial name
- Pupatonia atoma Ponder, 1965

Species of sea snail

Pupatonia atoma is a species of minute sea snails, marine gastropod mollusks in the family Eatoniellidae, the eatoniellids. It is endemic to New Zealand, found in the waters of the southern South Island, Stewart Island, the New Zealand Subantarctic Islands and the Chatham Islands.

== Description ==
In the original description, Ponder described the species as below:

Shell very minute, solid, pupoid, white, imperforate. Whorls 4, protoconch dome-shaped, not marked off, smooth; whorls weakly convex, false margined, with distinct growth lines and very fine, irregular, spiral scratches. Body whorl not swollen, periphery and base rounded. Aperture oval, peristome thickened, especially in anterior and posterior corners. Columella thick, vertical, inner lip a little oblique above. Posterior corner of aperture thick and weakly angled. Outer hip bent down and produced forward slightly near suture, nearly straight below, edge sharp, thickened internally. Differs from other species of the genus in its smaller size. Animal, operculum and radula unknown.

Shells of the species have fine, irregular spiral scratches. The shell of the holotype of the species has a height of 0.8 mm (0.031 in), and a width of 0.4 mm (0.016 in).

== Taxonomy ==
The species was first described by Winston Ponder in 1965. The holotype of the species is held by the Canterbury Museum.

== Distribution and habitat ==
P. atoma is endemic to New Zealand, found in the waters of the southern South Island, Stewart Island, the Snares Islands, Bounty Islands, Campbell Islands and the Chatham Islands.
