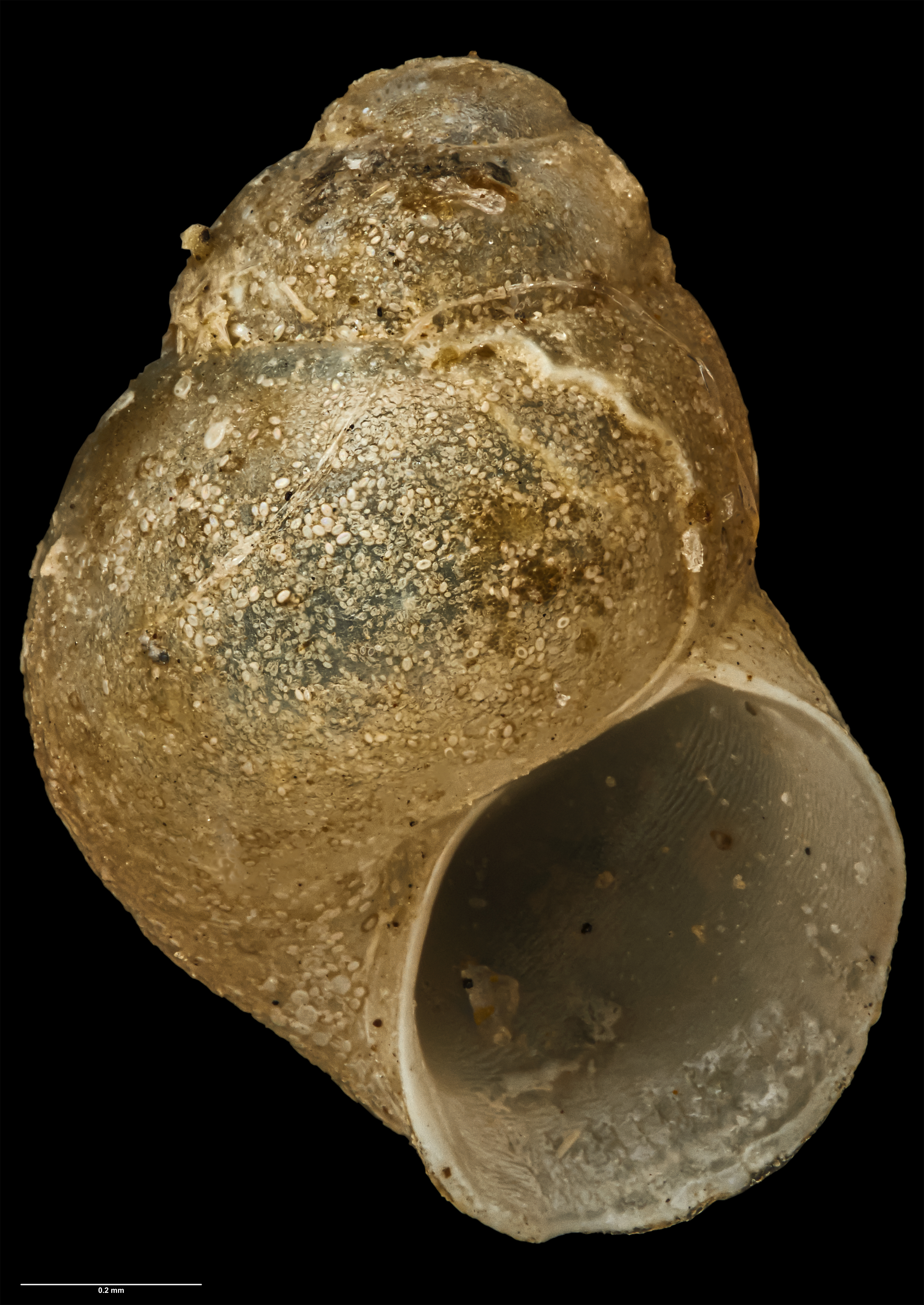
- Holotype of Eatoniella pullmitra from Auckland War Memorial Museum

Scientific classification
- Domain: Eukaryota
- Kingdom: Animalia
- Phylum: Mollusca
- Class: Gastropoda
- Subclass: Caenogastropoda
- Order: Littorinimorpha
- Family: Eatoniellidae
- Genus: Eatoniella
- Species: E. pullmitra

Binomial name
- Eatoniella pullmitra (Ponder, 1965)

Synonyms
- Eatoniella (Dardaniopsis) pullmitra Ponder 1965

= Eatoniella pullmitra =

Species of gastropod

Eatoniella pullmitra is a species of marine gastropod mollusc in the family Eatoniellidae. First described by Winston Ponder in 1965, it is endemic to the waters of New Zealand. The species has a preference for living on algae found in the sublittoral zone.

== Description ==
Eatoniella pullmitra has a smooth, ovate shell with four whorls. The shell is yellowish-white, with a semi-transparent aperture and a white umbilical area. The holotype measured 1.23mm by 0.85mm.

The species is similar in appearance to Eatoniella atervisceralis and Eatoniella dilatata, but can be distinguished by its broader shell and larger umbilicus.

== Distribution ==
The species is endemic to New Zealand. The holotype was collected by Ponder himself on 4 September 1964, on soft brown algae adjacent to Quarantine Island in the Otago Harbour.

The species has a preference for living in the sublittoral zone of the waters of New Zealand, and is found in the North Island, South Island, Steward Island, the Chatham Islands and the Bounty Islands. It has also been recorded living in the littoral zone in Otago Harbour.
