= Crassitoniella thola =

Scientific classification
- Kingdom: Animalia
- Phylum: Mollusca
- Class: Gastropoda
- Subclass: Caenogastropoda
- Order: Littorinimorpha
- Superfamily: Cingulopsoidea
- Family: Eatoniellidae
- Genus: Crassitoniella
- Species: C. thola

Binomial name
- Crassitoniella thola Ponder, 1965

Synonyms
- Eatoniella (Albitoniella) thola Ponder, 1965; Eatoniella thola Ponder, 1965 (original combination)

Species of sea snail

Crassitoniella thola is a species of sea snail in the genus Crassitoniella. It is endemic to New Zealand, found off the northern coast of the North Island, primarily in the waters surrounding Manawatāwhi / Three Kings Islands.

== Description ==
In the original description, Ponder described the species as below:

Shell small, smooth, shining, with a blunt protoconch. Whorls 3½, lightly convex, false margined, thin, transparent, protoconch large, bluntly dome-shaped, smooth, not distinctly marked off; body whorl large, periphery and base rounded. Aperture large, round, peristome continuous, weakly thickened; inner lip spread over body whorl as a thin layer; columella weakly thickened, vertical; a narrow chink behind columella but no umbilicus; outer lip excavated below, dilated, bent downwards slightly posteriorly, a transparent narrow zone behind. Colour pale yellowish, a narrow white band below periphery and umbilical region. There is some variation in the height of the spire and the bluntness of the protoconch. Animal, radula and operculum unknown.

The species' shells are more bluntly conical and wider than Eatoniella pallida, which has a similar appearance. The shell of the holotype of the species has a height of 0.95 mm (0.037 in), and a width of 1.25 mm (0.049 in).

== Taxonomy ==
The species was first described by Winston Ponder in 1965 as Eatoniella (Albitoniella) thola, who tentatively placed the species within the subgenus Albitoniella. The holotype of the species is held by the National Institute of Water and Atmospheric Research. Ponder and E. K. Yoo stated that the species was likely a member of Crassitoniella in 1978. The species was recombined as Crassitoniella thola in 1995.

== Distribution and habitat ==
C. thola is endemic to the waters of north of the North Island of New Zealand, primarily found around Manawatāwhi / Three Kings Islands. Some members have been found in the Bay of Plenty, and off the eastern coast of East Cape.
