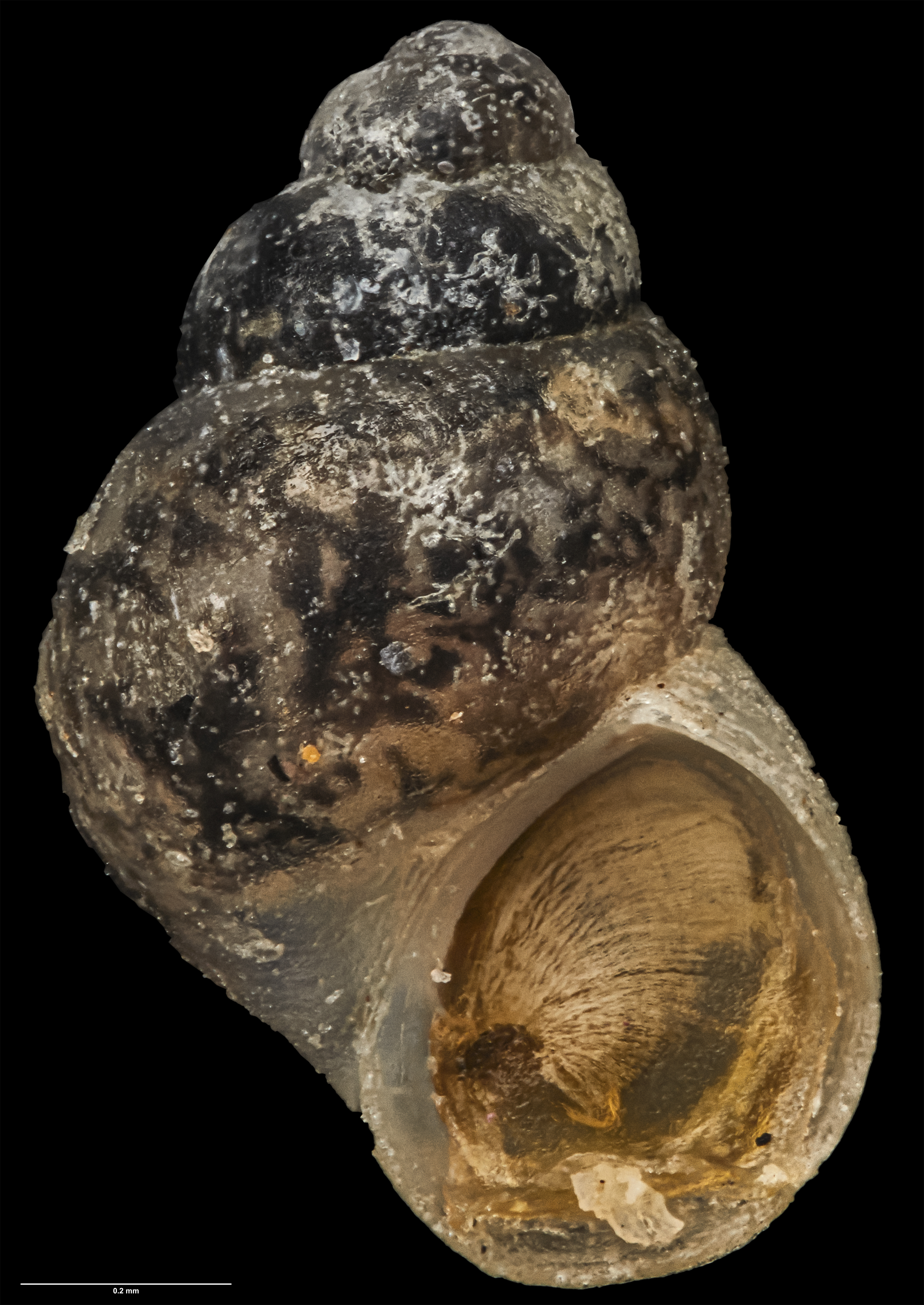
- Holotype of Eatoniella atervisceralis from Auckland War Memorial Museum

Scientific classification
- Kingdom: Animalia
- Phylum: Mollusca
- Class: Gastropoda
- Subclass: Caenogastropoda
- Order: Littorinimorpha
- Superfamily: Cingulopsoidea
- Family: Eatoniellidae
- Genus: Eatoniella
- Species: E. atervisceralis

Binomial name
- Eatoniella atervisceralis Ponder, 1965

Synonyms
- Eatoniella (Dardaniopsis) atervisceralis Ponder 1965; Eatoniella (Eatoniella) atervisceralis Ponder 1965

= Eatoniella atervisceralis =

Species of gastropod

Eatoniella atervisceralis is a species of marine gastropod mollusc in the family Eatoniellidae. It was first described by Winston F. Ponder in 1965. It is endemic to the waters of New Zealand.

== Description ==
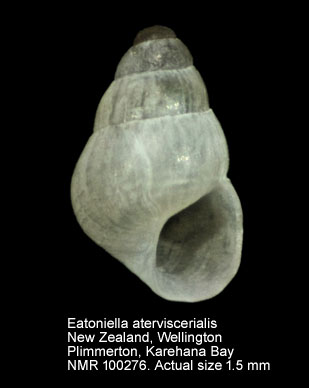
Type specimen collected from Karehana Bay, Porirua

In the original description, Ponder described the species as follows:

Shell minute, conical, smooth, shining, with convex whorls, transparent. Whorls 4 1/2, strongly convex; protoconch not marked off, small. Sculpture absent except for slightly oblique growth lines, these sometimes strong. Sutures indistinctly false margined. Body whorl large, inflated. Aperture oval, slightly angled posteriorly; peristome continuous, fairly thin; inner lip evenly concave, narrow, columella nearly vertical, Outer lip slightly retracted, evenly convex, hardly thickened. Umbilicus a small chink, ‘but deep and definite and always present. Colour yellowish-white, aperture and lower part of base white. There is some variation in size and in the relative height of the spire.

Animal: (Portobello, Dunedin). The visceral mass and mantle cavity roof are pigmented with large, irregular, close black blotches or are uniform jet-black. The head and foot are unpigmented (preserved material). The black visceral mass can be easily seen in dried material that has been collected alive, thus facilitating dentification.
Operculum: Oval, fairly thick, slightly curved. Muscle insertion area transparent, not greatly thickened, but rough, pale yellowish and broken irregularly some distance from outer edge which is clear and colourless. Peg of moderate length, yellowish, curved. Nucleus fairly clearly defined and rather large for genus.

Radula: Typical of genus. Central 2 + 1 + 2, lateral 2+ 1 + 2, with a strong basal rib; inner marginal 1 + 1 + 2, the second denticle rather weak, outer marginal finely serrate.

E. atervisceralis measures 1.23 mm (0.048 in) by 0.75 mm (0.030 in). This species can be distinguished from E. pullmitra due to its smaller umbilicus, evenly convex outer lip, taller spire, and the colour of the animal, and from E. dilatata due to its narrow inner lip, oval aperture and rounded peristome. Live specimens of the species can be most easily identified due to the black visceral mass visible through the shell.

== Taxonomy ==
The species was first described by Winston Ponder in 1965, who used the name Eatoniella (Dardaniopsis) atervisceralis. The modern formatting of the name without a subgenus, Eatoniella atervisceralis, was established by Hamish Spencer and Richard C. Willan in 1995. The holotype of the species was collected by E.C. Smith in October 1951, on coralline algae at low tide from Lonneker's Bay, Stewart Island in New Zealand. It is held by the Auckland War Memorial Museum.

== Distribution and habitat ==
The species is Endemic to New Zealand, found in the waters of the South Island up to Thompson Sound, around Stewart Island, at a depth ranging between 0–32 m (0–105 ft), the Chatham Islands, and around the North Island, often amongst seaweed.
