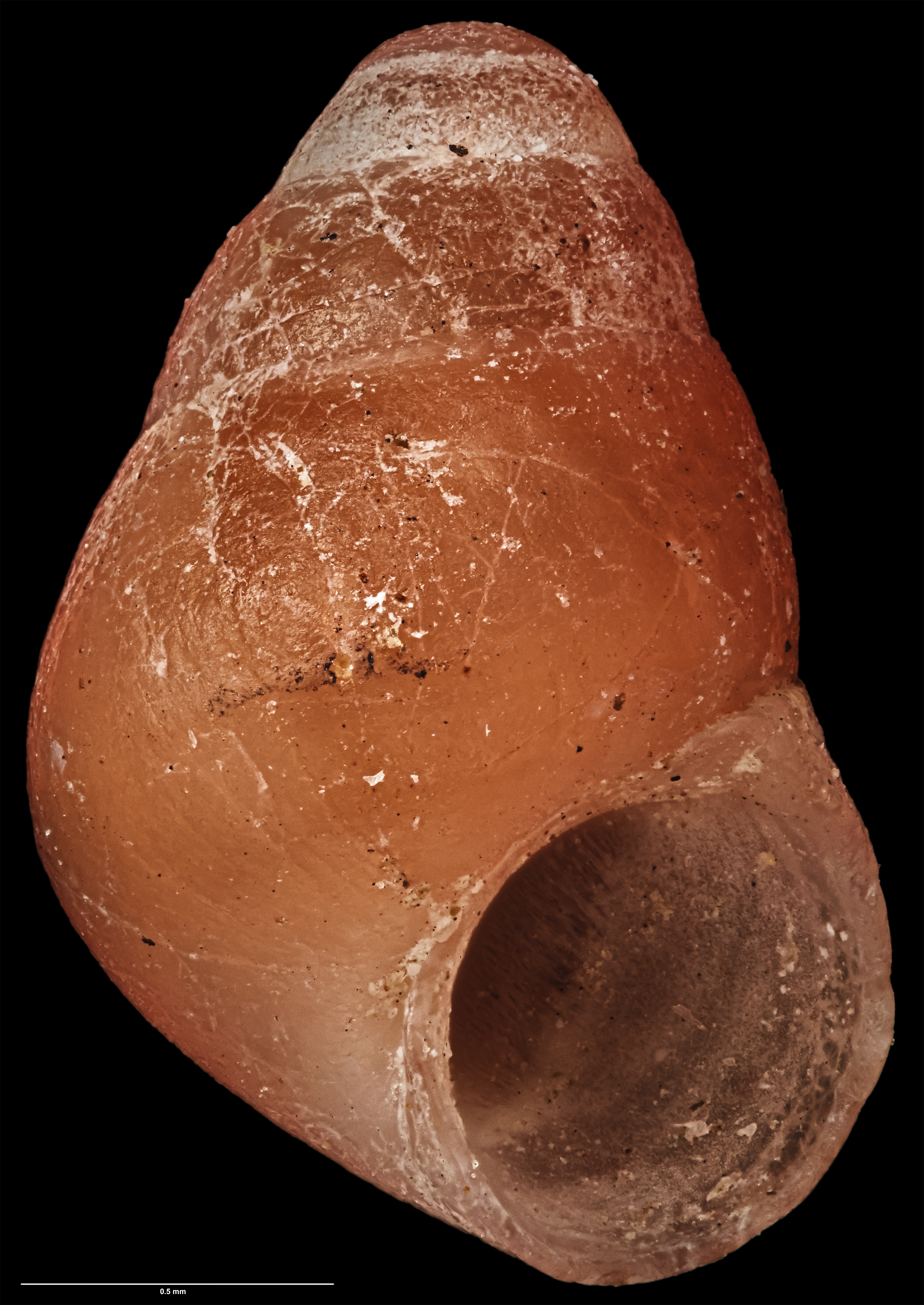
- Holotype of Crassitoniella carinata from Auckland War Memorial Museum

Scientific classification
- Kingdom: Animalia
- Phylum: Mollusca
- Class: Gastropoda
- Subclass: Caenogastropoda
- Order: Littorinimorpha
- Family: Eatoniellidae
- Genus: Crassitoniella
- Species: C. carinata

Binomial name
- Crassitoniella carinata Ponder, 1965

= Crassitoniella carinata =

Species of gastropod

Crassitoniella carinata is a species of marine gastropod mollusc in the family Eatoniellidae. It was first described by Winston Ponder in 1965, and it is the type species for the genus Crassitoniella. It is endemic to the waters of New Zealand.

== Description ==
Crassitoniella carinata has a distinctive orange-red coloured ovate-conical shell, with a wide protoconch. It is solid, with a broadly blunt protoconch and has a distinct peripheral cord. The living animal has white long tentacles, with large eyes. The holotype of the species measures 1.91 mm (0.075 in) in height and 1.3 mm (0.051 in) in diameter. The species' shell is similar to the Australian species Crassitoniella flammea, but differs by having a uniform colour and distinct peripheral cord.

== Taxonomy ==
The species was first described by Winston Ponder in 1965, as the type species of Crassitoniella. The holotype was collected from Piwhane / Spirits Bay near Cape Reinga in Northland, New Zealand, in April 1951 by Ken Hipkins. It is held by the Auckland War Memorial Museum.

== Distribution and habitat ==
The species is Endemic to New Zealand. The species was first documented on the east coast of the North Island as far south as the Bay of Plenty, in 1995 a specimen was first identified on the west coast of the North Island. Additional specimens have been found in the waters near Manawatāwhi / Three Kings Islands. C. carinata typically lives on algae.
