= Pupatonia minutula =

Scientific classification
- Domain: Eukaryota
- Kingdom: Animalia
- Phylum: Mollusca
- Class: Gastropoda
- Subclass: Caenogastropoda
- Order: Littorinimorpha
- Family: Eatoniellidae
- Genus: Pupatonia
- Species: P. minutula

Binomial name
- Pupatonia minutula Powell, 1933

Species of Pupatonia

Pupatonia minutula is a species in the genus Pupatonia.
