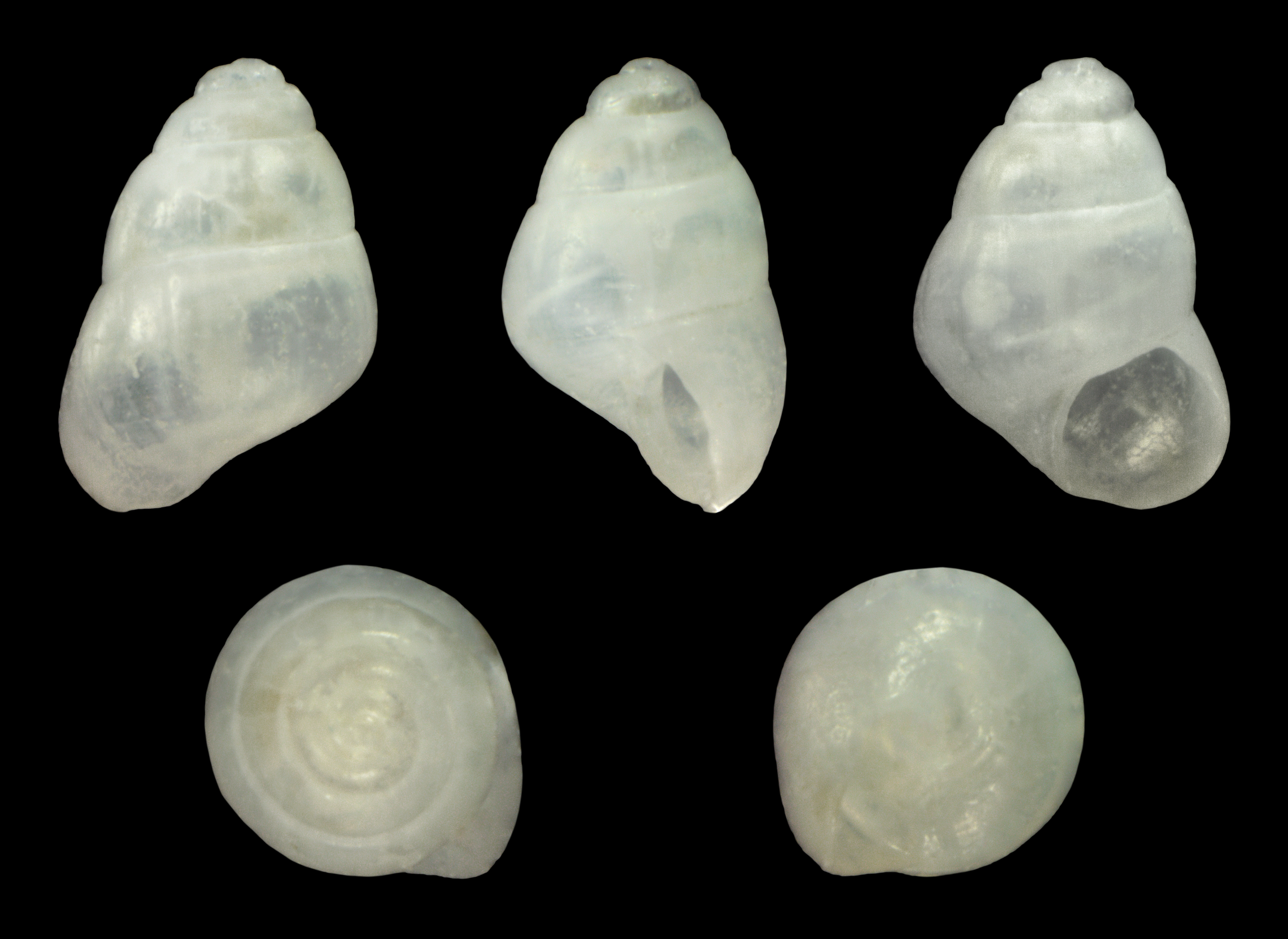
- Powellisetia fallax

Scientific classification
- Kingdom: Animalia
- Phylum: Mollusca
- Class: Gastropoda
- Subclass: Caenogastropoda
- Order: Littorinimorpha
- Family: Rissoidae
- Genus: Powellisetia; Ponder, 1965

Type species
- Rissoa porcellana (Suter, 1908)

= Powellisetia =

Powellisetia Temporal range: Miocene–Present

Genus of gastropods

Powellisetia is a genus of minute sea snails, marine gastropod mollusks micromollusks in the family Rissoidae. The genus is primarily found in the Southern Hemisphere.

== Description ==
In the original description, Ponder described Powellisetia as follows:

Shell small, whorls flattened, convex or shouldered, thin, either smooth, finely spirally striate or with one or two carinae, protoconch slightly tilted, rather flat on top, smooth or finely spirally striate. Peristome continuous, the columella nearly vertical, not much thickened: inner lip thin; outer lip sharp edged, somewhat thickened within, and, typically, a varix externally (not present in some species). A fairly strong to weak posterior sinus and a very shallow excavation anteriorly. Often perforate.

Members of Powellisetia have a thin, horny operculum, which is transparent and ranges from ovate to ear-shaped, typically with two whorla and a wide nucleus. The genus can be distinguished due to having a large initial whorl on the protoconch of the shell, having more ovate shells than Onoba, and either having no teleoconch sculpture, or a sculpture of fine spiral lirae.

== Taxonomy ==
The genus was first described by Winston Ponder in 1965, who named the genus after malacologist A. W. B. Powell, and named Rissoa porcellana (current accepted name Powellisetia porcellana) as the type species. Many species had previously been described as members of Notosetia.

== Distribution ==
Most members of Powellisetia are found in the waters of New Zealand, Australia, Antarctica and sub-Antarctic regions of the world. Fossils of the species date to the Miocene.

== Species ==
Species within the genus Powellisetia include:

- Powellisetia arnaudi Ponder, 1983
- Powellisetia australis (R. B. Watson, 1886)
- Powellisetia bilirata Ponder, 1965
- † Powellisetia comes (H. J. Finlay, 1926)
- Powellisetia crassilabrum (A. W. B. Powell, 1940)
- Powellisetia deserta (E. A. Smith, 1907)
- Powellisetia epulata (Laws, 1941) †
- † Powellisetia europaea Landau, Ceulemans & Van Dingenen, 2018
- Powellisetia fairchildi (A. W. B. Powell, 1933)
- Powellisetia fallax Kay, 1979
- Powellisetia foveauxana (E. C. Smith, 1962)
- Powellisetia gradata (Suter, 1908)
- Powellisetia inornata (Strebel, 1908)
- Powellisetia lineata (E. C. Smith, 1962)
- Powellisetia microlirata Ponder & Worsfold, 1994
- Powellisetia microstriata (Murdoch, 1905)
- † Powellisetia paroeca (H. J. Finlay, 1924)
- Powellisetia pelseneeri (Thiele, 1912)
- Powellisetia philomelae (R. B. Watson, 1886)
- Powellisetia ponderi Numanami, 1996
- Powellisetia porcellana (Suter, 1908)
- Powellisetia porcellanoides (A. W. B. Powell, 1937)
- Powellisetia principis (R. B. Watson, 1886)
- † Powellisetia prisca (H. J. Finlay, 1924)
- Powellisetia retusa (A. W. B. Powell, 1927)
- Powellisetia simillima (May, 1915)
- Powellisetia subcarinata (A. W. B. Powell, 1940)
- Powellisetia subgradata (A. W. B. Powell, 1937)
- Powellisetia subtenuis (A. W. B. Powell, 1937)
- Powellisetia tenuisculpta (A. W. B. Powell, 1933)
- Powellisetia unicarinata (A. W. B. Powell, 1930)
- Powellisetia varicosa Ponder, 1983

Species brought into synonymy

- Powellisetia helena (W. H. Turton, 1932): synonym of Microsetia helena W. H. Turton, 1932
- † Powellisetia marshalli Grant-Mackie & Chapman-Smith, 1971: synonym of Haurakia marshalli (Grant-Mackie & Chapman-Smith, 1971)

== Gallery ==
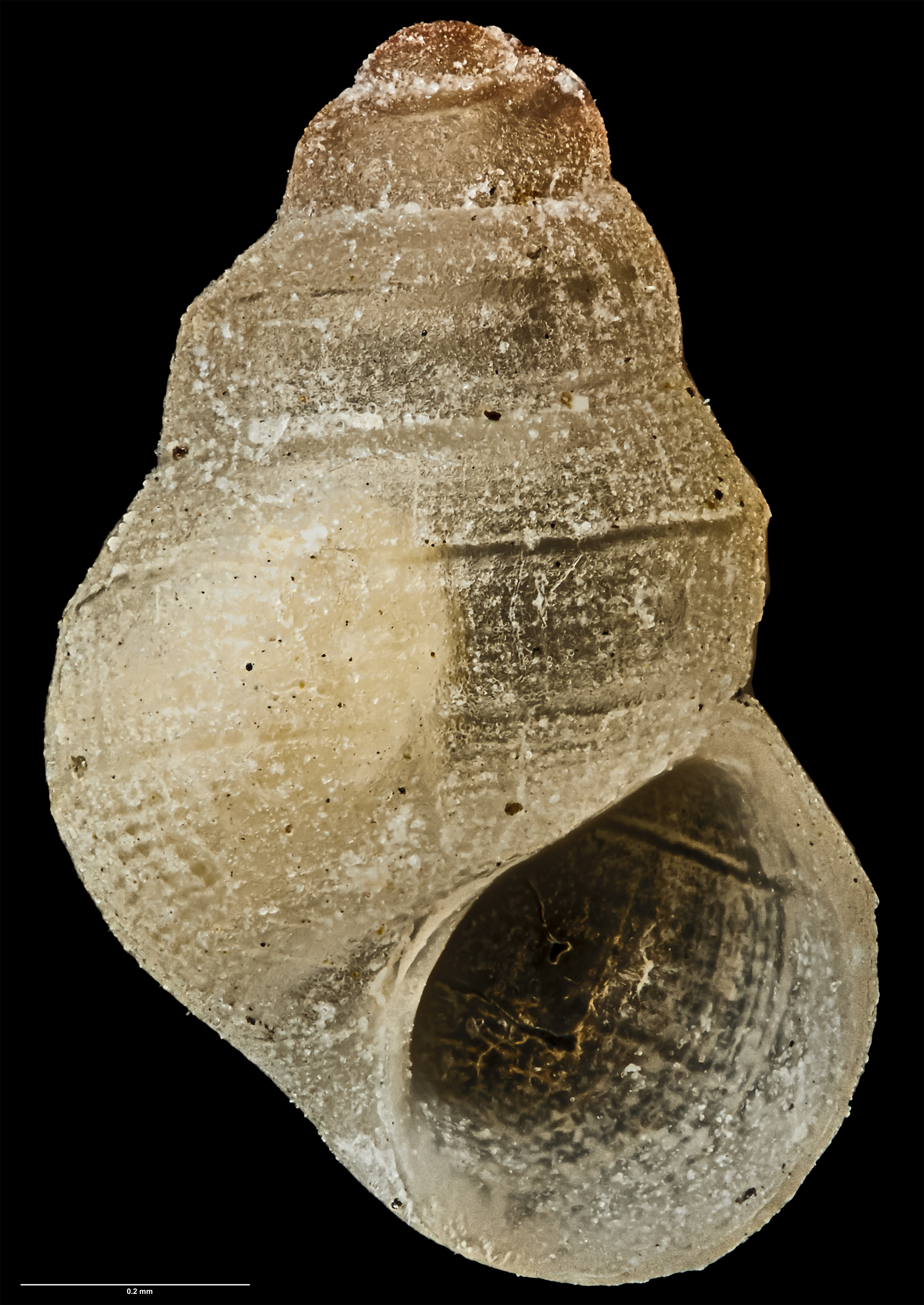
Powellisetia bilirata

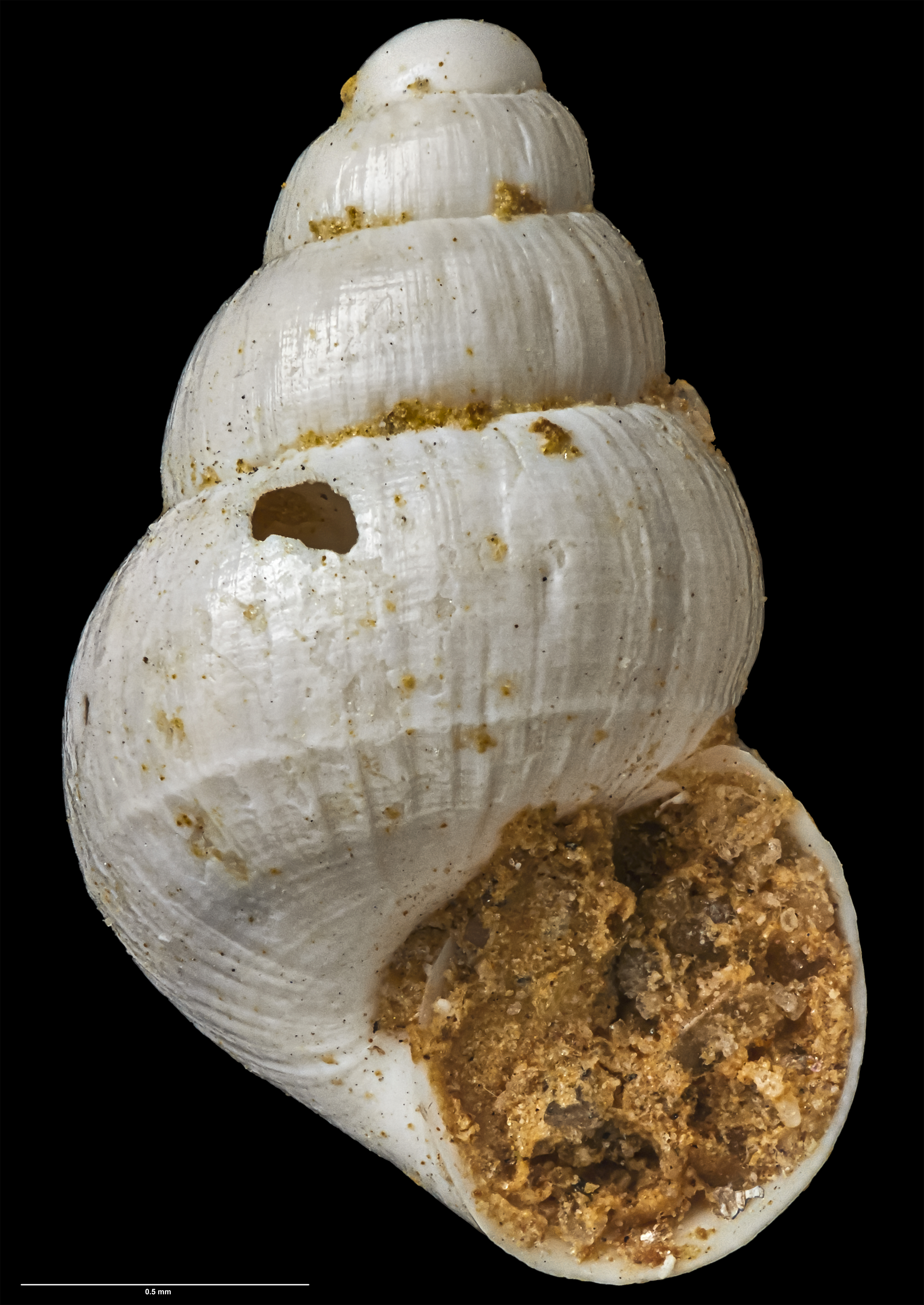
Powellisetia comes

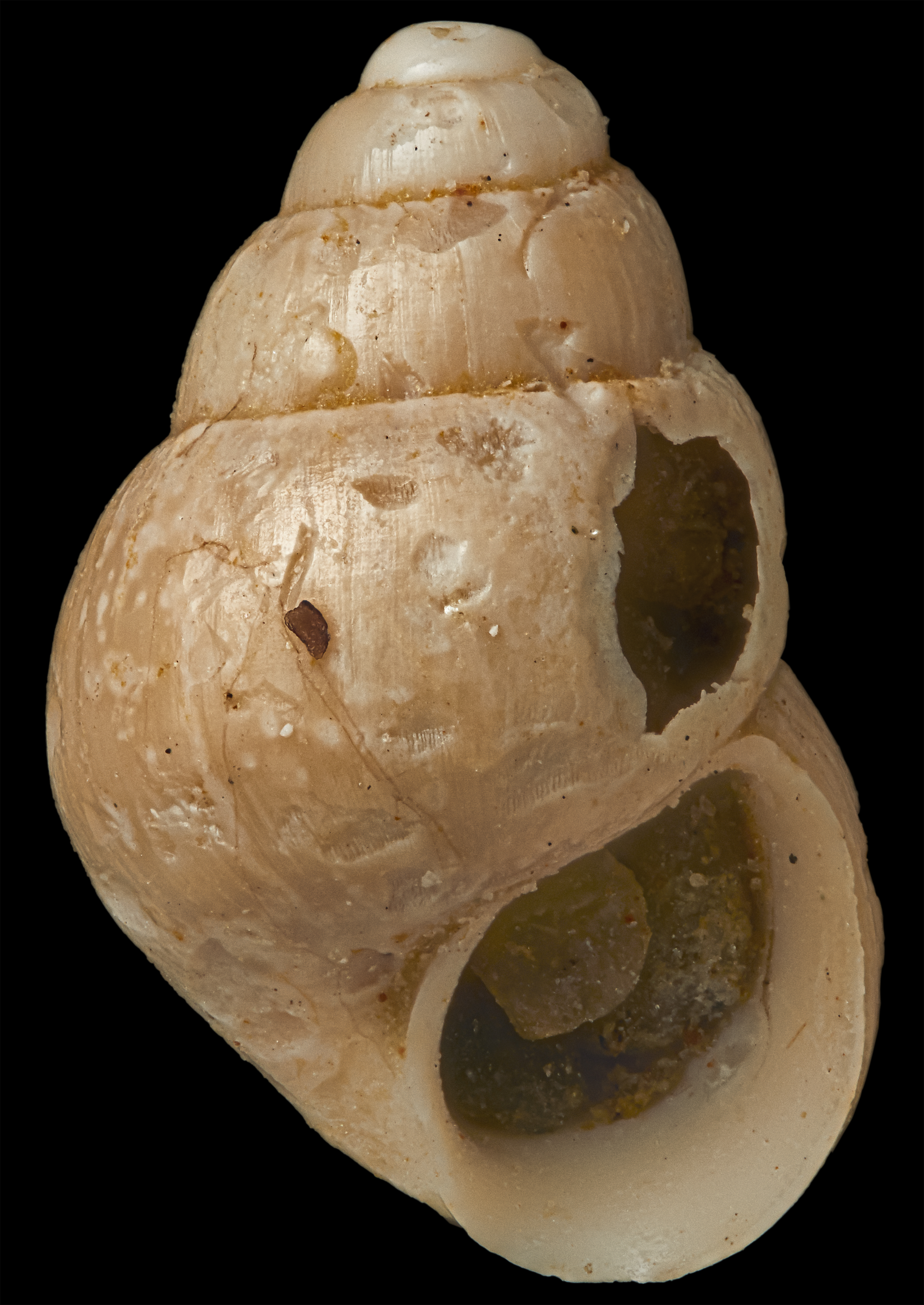
Powellisetia paroeca

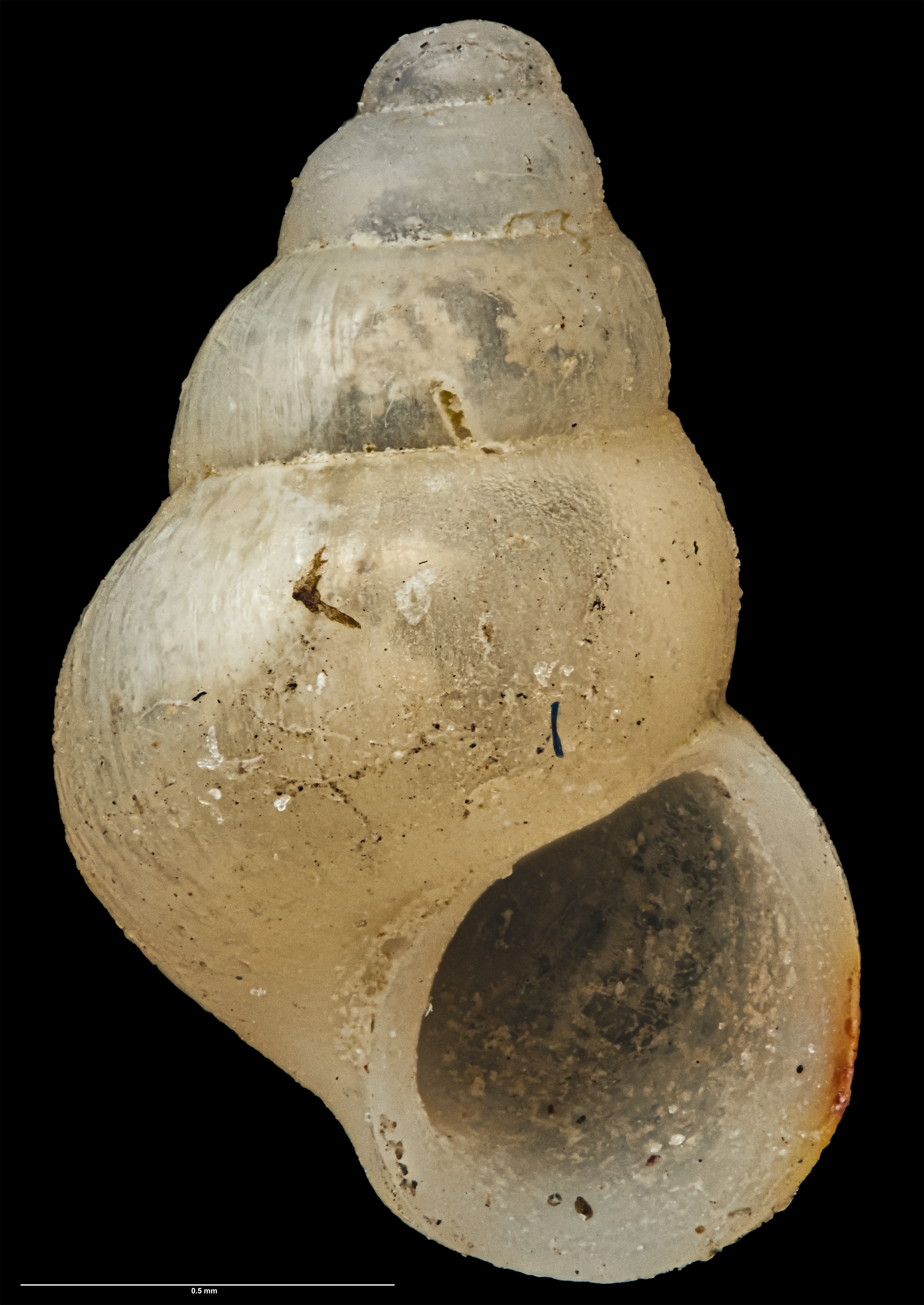
Powellisetia porcellana

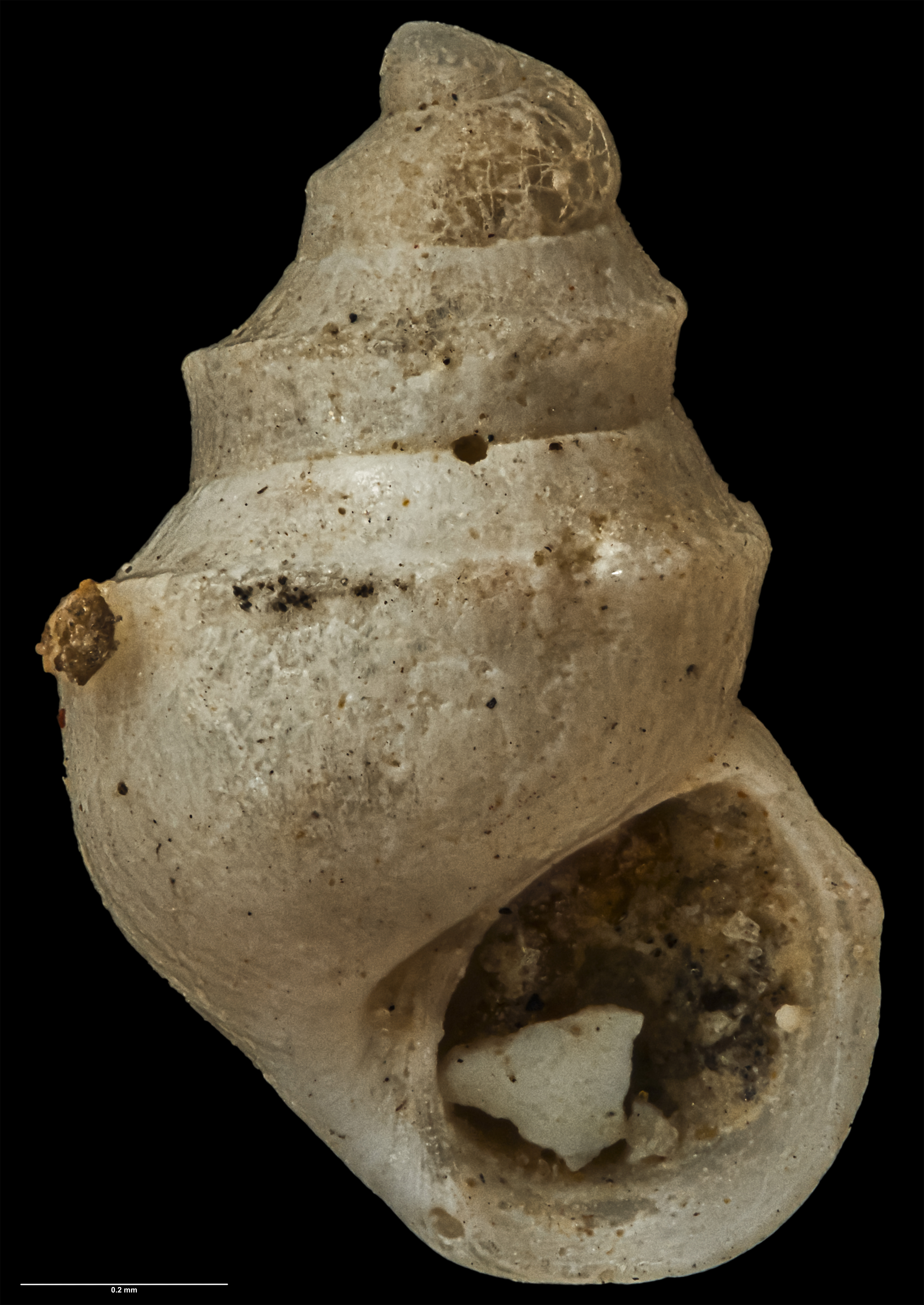
Powellisetia unicarinata
