= Liratoniella =

Liratoniella bicarinata

Scientific classification
- Kingdom: Animalia
- Phylum: Mollusca
- Class: Gastropoda
- Subclass: Caenogastropoda
- Order: Littorinimorpha
- Superfamily: Cingulopsoidea
- Family: Eatoniellidae
- Genus: Liratoniella; Ponder, 1965
- Species: L. bicarinata

Binomial name
- Liratoniella bicarinata Ponder, 1965

Monotypic genus of sea snails

Liratoniella is a genus of small sea snails, marine gastropod mollusks in the family Eatoniellidae. It is monotypic, being represented by the single species Liratoniella bicarinata. L. bicarinata is endemic to New Zealand, found off the coast of Three Kings Islands and on Middlesex Bank, living on Bryozoan substrates.

== Description ==
In the original description, Ponder described L. bicarinata as below:

Shell of moderate size for the family, white, with a dark red inner chitinous layer showing through, solid yet semi-transparent, with two heavy spiral keels on each whorl. Protoconch sharply angled, a weak cord on edge of angle, rather flat on top, not distinctly marked off. Whorls 4, two strong spiral cords on each whorl, one cord just below suture, other just above, with suture in a narrow groove between them. A flat space between cords, raised higher than sutural groove, and smooth except for slightly oblique, fine growth lines. A strong spiral cord on base emerging at junction of outer lip with inner lip, Just behind outer lip there are only weak spirals. Aperture nearly circular, columella strongly excavated, thin; peristome continuous, sharp. Outer lip bent downwards in posterior corner and reflected slightly. Last half of body whorl with no chitinous layer and therefore pure white.

The animal is unpigmented, with large eyes and a short bliobed snout. The holotype of the species has a height of 1.975 mm (0.0778 in), and a width of 1.26 mm (0.050 in).

== Taxonomy ==
The genus and species were first described by Winston Ponder in 1965 in the same paper. The holotype of the species is held by the National Institute of Water and Atmospheric Research.

== Distribution and habitat ==
This marine species is endemic to New Zealand and occurs off Three Kings Islands and on Middlesex Bank, at a depth ranging between 37–805 m (121–2,641 ft). The species is known to live on Bryozoan substrates.
