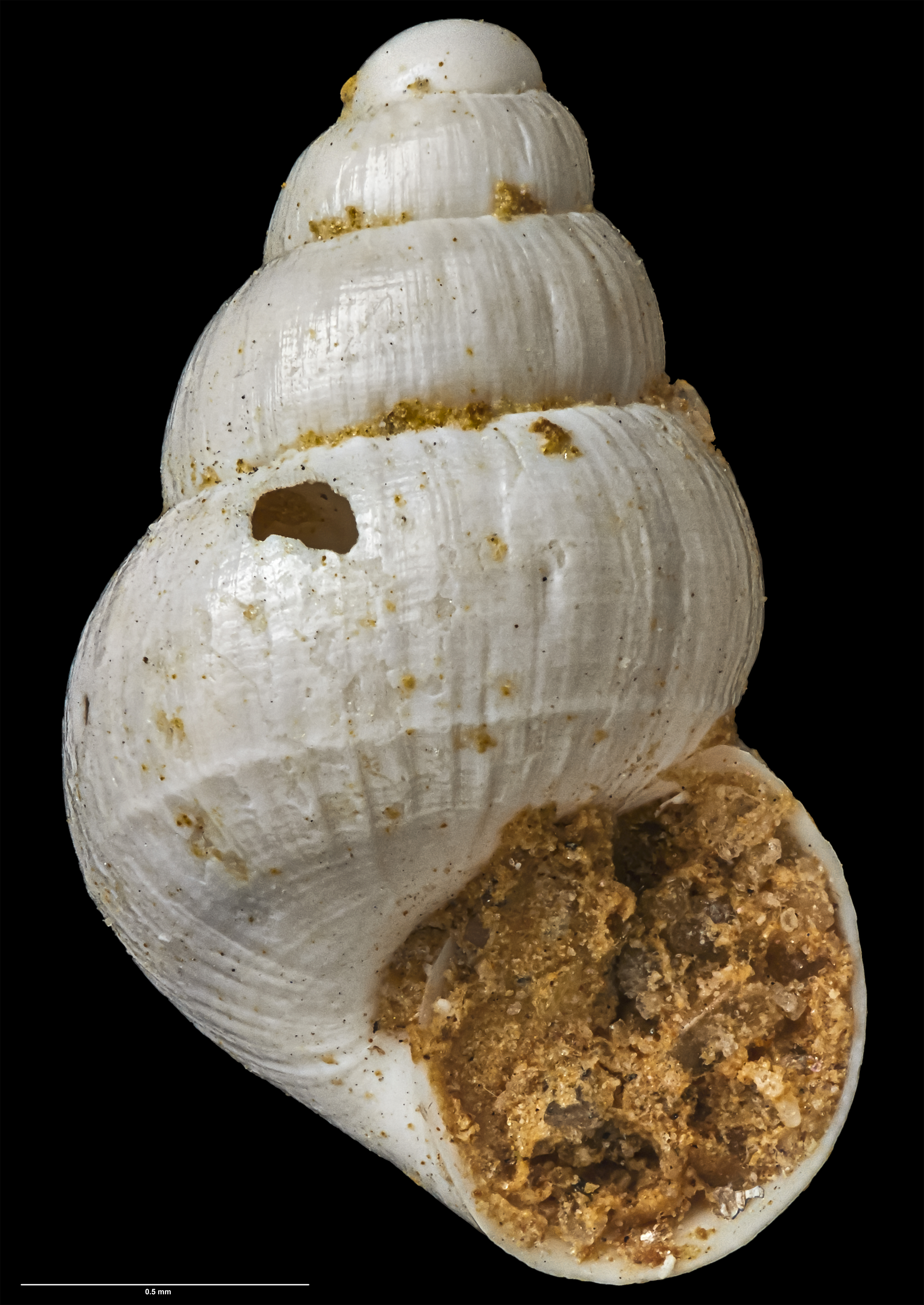
- Holotype of Powellisetia comes from Auckland War Memorial Museum

Scientific classification
- Kingdom: Animalia
- Phylum: Mollusca
- Class: Gastropoda
- Subclass: Caenogastropoda
- Order: Littorinimorpha
- Family: Rissoidae
- Genus: Powellisetia
- Species: P. comes

Binomial name
- Powellisetia comes (Finlay, 1926)

Synonyms
- Powellia comes Finlay, 1926

= Powellisetia comes =

Species of gastropod

Powellisetia comes is an extinct species of marine gastropod mollusc in the family Rissoidae. First described by Harold John Finlay in 1926, it is known to have lived in New Zealand during the early Miocene.

== Description ==
Finlay described the species as follows:

Shell [subulate, highly polished, milk-white], but smaller, more inflated, and less slender [than Onoba lactea]. Whorls more convex, with deeper sutures. Peripheral subangle marked by a thread, indications of other spiral threads present. Faint axial plicae on upper whorls. Spire about 1½ times aperture in height, outlines a trifle convex. Outer lip and varix not nearly so crass as in last species, aperture suboval, less emarginate below. Umbilicus about same size, but less prominent, due to absence of encircling blunt angulation and rounder base. Height, 2 mm.; diameter, 1.2 mm. Locality,—[Pukeuri sandy clays (Awamoan, i.e. "Miocene") near Oamaru]. Nearly related to [Haurakia semireticulata], but shorter, with weaker peripheral thread and umbilicus.

== Distribution ==
Fossils of the species have only been identified in New Zealand. The holotype was collected from the Mount Harris Formation near Pukeuri, Otago, which dates to the early Miocene era.
