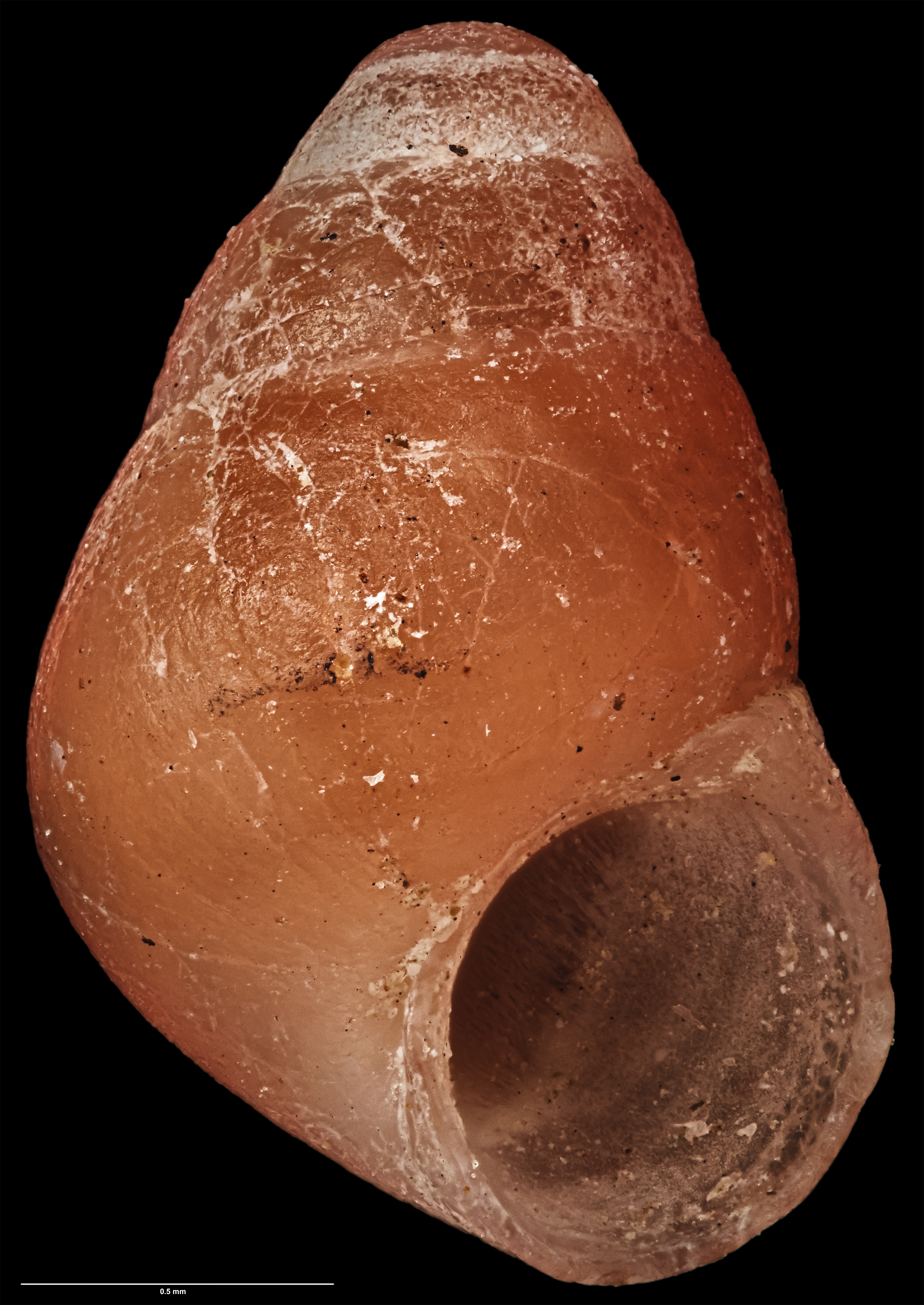
- Holotype of Crassitoniella carinata

Scientific classification
- Kingdom: Animalia
- Phylum: Mollusca
- Class: Gastropoda
- Subclass: Caenogastropoda
- Order: Littorinimorpha
- Family: Eatoniellidae
- Genus: Crassitoniella; Ponder, 1965

Type species
- Crassitoniella carinata Ponder, 1965

= Crassitoniella =

Genus of gastropods

Crassitoniella is a genus of minute sea snails, marine gastropod molluscs belonging to the family Eatoniellidae. First described by Winston Ponder in 1965, the genus is found in the waters of the South Pacific near Australia and New Zealand. Fossils of the species have been found on the coast of France.

== Description ==
In the original description, Ponder described the genus as below:

Shell: Solid, ovate-conical, peristome thick and heavy. Sculpture absent or a weak, single, peripheral cord. Colour orange, sometimes with white markings.

Animal: Similar to that of Eatoniella, but no opercular tentacles.
Operculum: Broad, with strong internal ridge. Muscle insertion area not differentiated, transparent. Columella margin strongly convex.

Radula: [Moderately long, the teeth small. Central very large, lateral cusps small, 1 + 1 + 1, a pair of lateral thickenings, and 3 pairs of basal processes, Lateral small, slightly curved, cusps 1 + 1 + 1, Inner marginal slightly larger than lateral, simple except for blunt process on inner side. Outer marginal small, with 3 denticles, the apex curved.].

Members of the genus have minute shells and a straight peg that is in approximately same plane as rest of the species' operculum, and are smooth except for their single peripheral cord. Crassitoniella can be identified due to their unique opercular and radular features.

== Taxonomy ==
Crassitoniella was first described by Winston Ponder in 1965, naming Crassitoniella carinata as the type species. Phylogenetic analysis places Crassitoniella within the Cingulopsoidea superfamily, being closely related to Eatoniella, and more distantly to Skenella, Eatonina and Eatoniella.

== Distribution ==
Crassitoniella is found in the waters of the South Pacific, on the shores of southeastern Australia, New Zealand. Fossils of the Chattian fossil species C. europaea have been found near Saint-Paul-lès-Dax in southwestern France.

== Habitat ==
Members of the genus are often found between the lower littoral zone and sublittoral zone. Both C. carinata and C. flammea are known to live on algae.

== Species ==
Species within the genus Crassitoniella include:

- Crassitoniella carinata Powell, 1965
- † Crassitoniella cirsophora (Cossmann, 1888)
- Crassitoniella erratica May, 1913
- † Crassitoniella europaea Lozouet, 1998
- Crassitoniella flammea Frauenfeld, 1867
- † Crassitoniella lozoueti Landau, Ceulemans & Van Dingenen, 2018
- Crassitoniella thola Ponder, 1965

Synonyms

- † Crassitoniella subbicolor (Ludbrook, 1956): synonym of † Crassitoniella erratica subbicolor (Ludbrook, 1956) (superseded rank)
