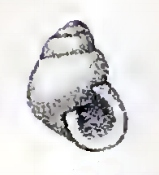
- Drawing with an apertural view of Putilla lucida

Scientific classification
- Kingdom: Animalia
- Phylum: Mollusca
- Class: Gastropoda
- Subclass: Vetigastropoda
- Family: Seguenziidae
- Genus: Putilla
- Species: P. lucida

Binomial name
- Putilla lucida A. Adams, 1867

= Putilla lucida =

Species of gastropod

Putilla lucida is a species of sea snail, a marine gastropod mollusc, unassigned in the superfamily Seguenzioidea.

== Description ==
The solid, white shell is rimate. it is subpellucid, smooth, and shining, white. The four whorls are convex. The thick outer lip simple.

== Distribution ==
This marine species occurs off Japan.
