= Powellisetia deserta =

Scientific classification
- Kingdom: Animalia
- Phylum: Mollusca
- Class: Gastropoda
- Subclass: Caenogastropoda
- Order: Littorinimorpha
- Family: Rissoidae
- Genus: Powellisetia
- Species: P. deserta

Binomial name
- Powellisetia deserta (Smith, 1907)

Species of gastropod

Powellisetia deserta is a species of minute sea snail, a marine gastropod mollusk or micromollusk in the family Rissoidae.

== Description ==
The maximum recorded shell length is 2.6 mm.

== Habitat ==
Minimum recorded depth is 16 m. Maximum recorded depth is 18 m.
