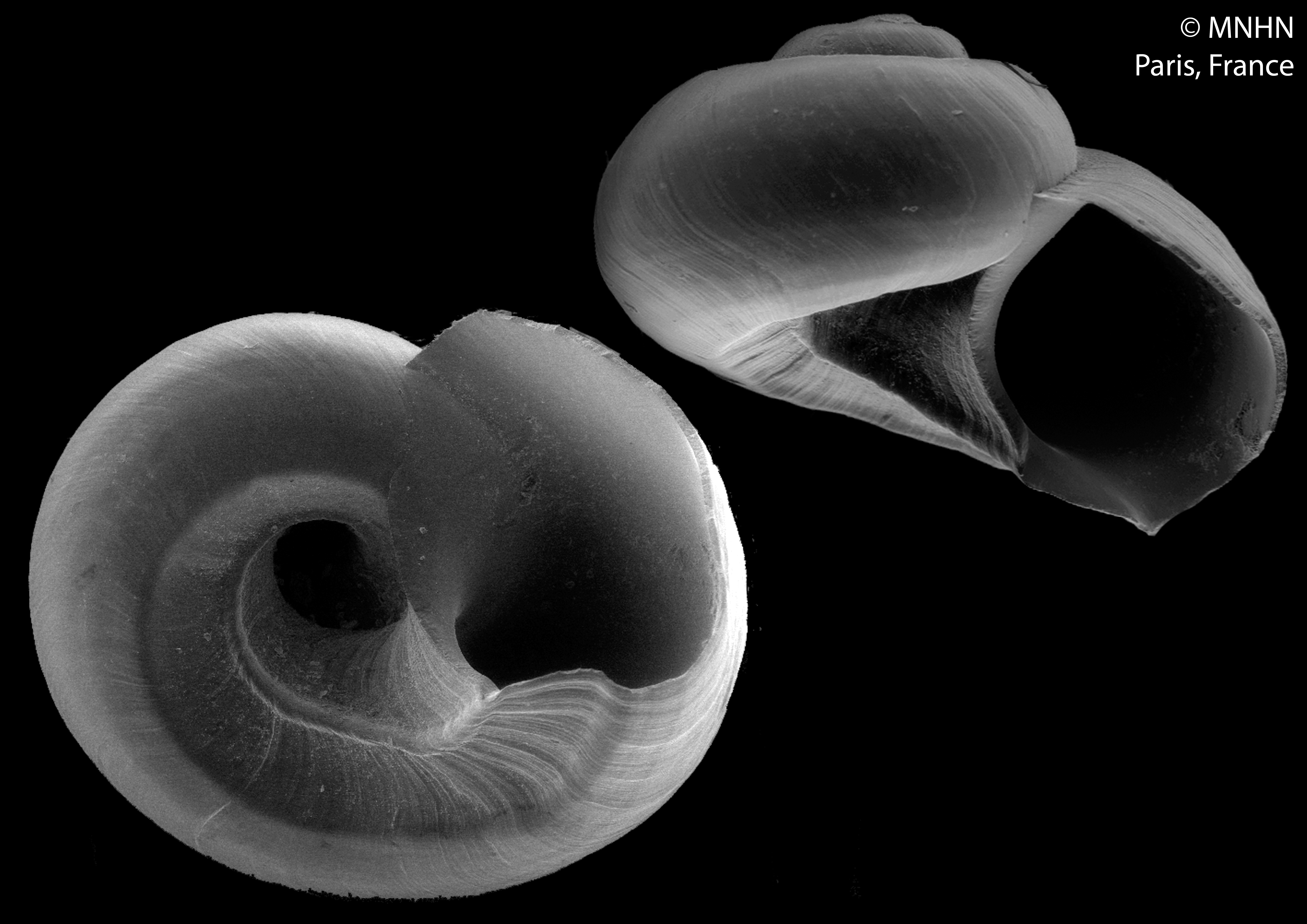
- Shell of Ponderinella difficilis (holotype at MNHN, Paris)

Scientific classification
- Kingdom: Animalia
- Phylum: Mollusca
- Class: Gastropoda
- Subclass: Caenogastropoda
- Order: Littorinimorpha
- Superfamily: Truncatelloidea
- Family: Elachisinidae
- Genus: Ponderinella; B.A. Marshall, 1988

Type species
- Ponderinella lignicola B.A. Marshall, 1988

= Ponderinella =

Genus of gastropods

Ponderinella is a genus of minute sea snails, marine gastropod molluscs or micromolluscs in the family Elachisinidae.

They are marine snails, only found in salt water environment. It was first discovered by Moolenbeek, R. G. and Hoenselaar, H. J. in 1995.

== Species ==
This genus includes the following species:

- Ponderinella carlosi Rolán & Rubio, 2002
- Ponderinella difficilis Rubio & Rolán, 2018
- Ponderinella finalis Rolán & Rubio, 2002
- Ponderinella gabonensis Rolán & Rubio, 2012
- Ponderinella ghanensis (Rolán & Ryall, 2000)
- Ponderinella lignicola B.A. Marshall, 1988
- Ponderinella major Hasegawa, 1997
- Ponderinella minutissima Rolán & Rubio, 2002
- Ponderinella skeneoides Rolán & Rubio, 2002
- Ponderinella tornatica (Moolenbeek & Hoenselaar, 1995)
- Ponderinella xacriaba Absalão, 2009
