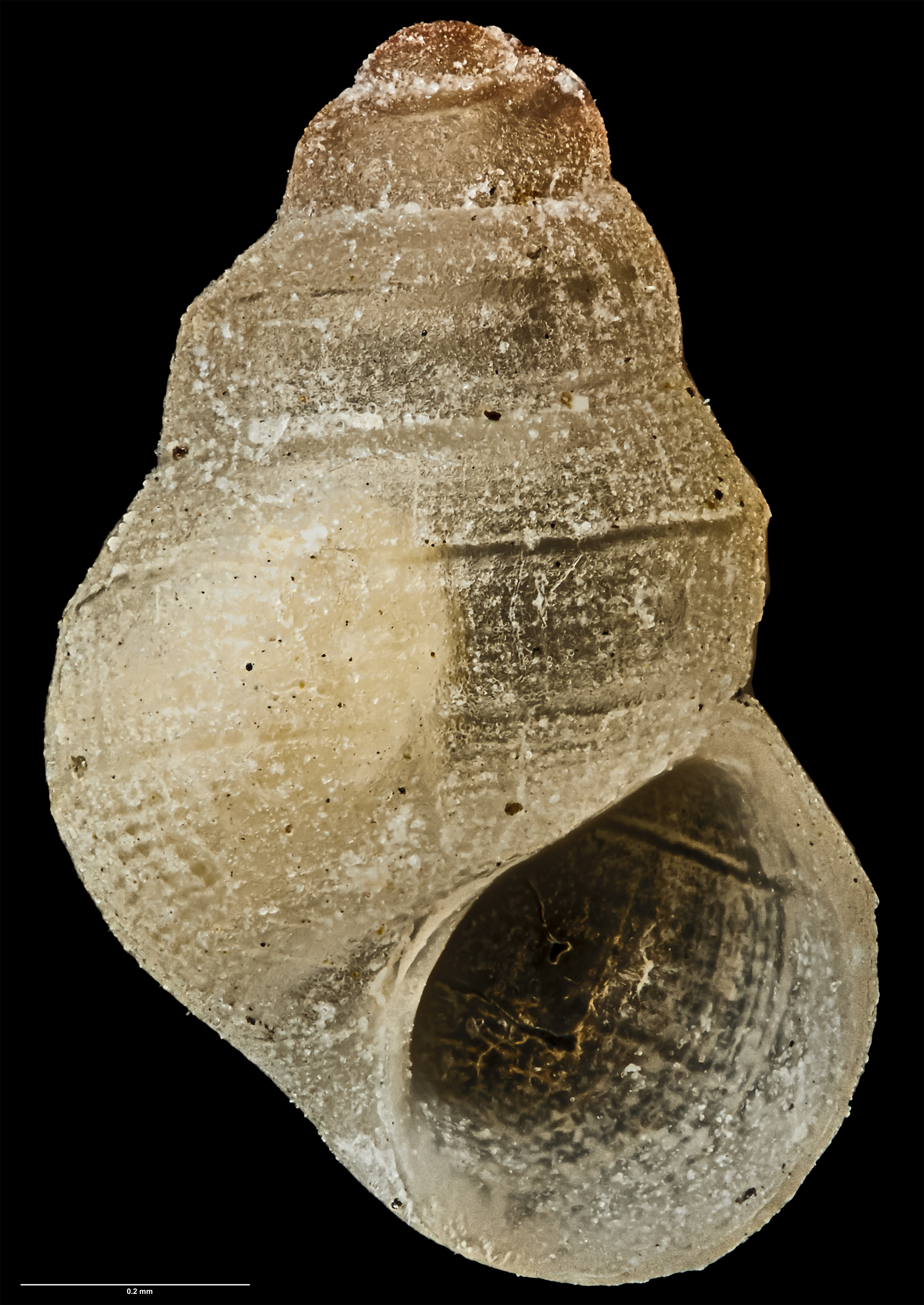
- Holotype of Powellisetia bilirata from Auckland War Memorial Museum

Scientific classification
- Kingdom: Animalia
- Phylum: Mollusca
- Class: Gastropoda
- Subclass: Caenogastropoda
- Order: Littorinimorpha
- Family: Rissoidae
- Genus: Powellisetia
- Species: P. bilirata

Binomial name
- Powellisetia bilirata (Ponder, 1965)

= Powellisetia bilirata =

Species of gastropod

Powellisetia bilirata is a species of marine gastropod mollusc in the family Rissoidae. First described by Winston Ponder in 1965, it is endemic to the waters of New Zealand.

== Description ==
In the original description, Ponder described Powellisetia bilirata as follows:

Shell minute, small for genus, rather solid, semi-transparent, strongly spirally striate, yellowish brown. Whorls 4, convex, angled by a strong spiral cord in middle of whorl; protoconch of 1½ whorls, finely spirally striate, transparent, apex slightly inrolled. Body whorl rather large, periphery and base rounded. Aperture relatively small, solid, oval angled above; inner lip and columella moderately thickened, concave, columella separated from base below: outer lip weakly channelled above and below, sharp edged, a weak varix behind, and slightly thickened internally. Sculpture of fine, but distinct and regular, spiral threads, the suprasutural and middle cord strong, raised, rather sharp, the latter forming an angle on the whorls, the former being continued over periphery as a strong cord. About 6 fine spirals above, and 6 below middle cord on penultimate, about 16 on base, but these numbers vary slightly in paratypes. Strong cords constant, sometimes disappear over last part of body whorl, but usually continuous. Umbilical chink present but no true umbilicus. Colour pale yellowish-brown, protoconch reddish-brown, Animal, operculum and radula unknown.

P. bilirata has two stronger spirals on its shell, that cross over the whorls at an angle. The species measures 1.05 mm (0.041 in), by 0.68 mm (0.027 in).

== Taxonomy ==
P. bilirata was first described by Winston Ponder in 1965. The holotype is held by the Auckland War Memorial Museum.

== Distribution ==
The species is endemic to New Zealand. The holotype was collected by Ken Hipkins on 9 April 1955 from shell sand at McGregors Bay, Whangārei Heads, Northland Region. It is found in to the north-east of the North Island, as far north as Manawatāwhi / Three Kings Islands, and has been found neat the volcanic Whakaari / White Island.
