= Crassitoniella flammea =

Scientific classification
- Kingdom: Animalia
- Phylum: Mollusca
- Class: Gastropoda
- Subclass: Caenogastropoda
- Order: Littorinimorpha
- Superfamily: Cingulopsoidea
- Family: Eatoniellidae
- Genus: Crassitoniella
- Species: C. flammea

Binomial name
- Crassitoniella flammea Ponder, 1965

Synonyms
- Rissoia (Setia) beddomei Tate, 1899 (unnecessary nom. nov. for Rissoa flamia Beddome, 1882); Rissoia (Setia) sophiae Henn, A.U. & Brazier, J.W. 1894; Sabanaea flammea Frauenfeld, 1867; Sabanea flammea Frauenfeld, 1867 ·

Species of sea snail

Crassitoniella flammea is a species of sea snail in the genus Crassitoniella.

== Distribution ==
This marine species is endemic to Australia and occurs off New South Wales, Queensland, Tasmania and Victoria.
