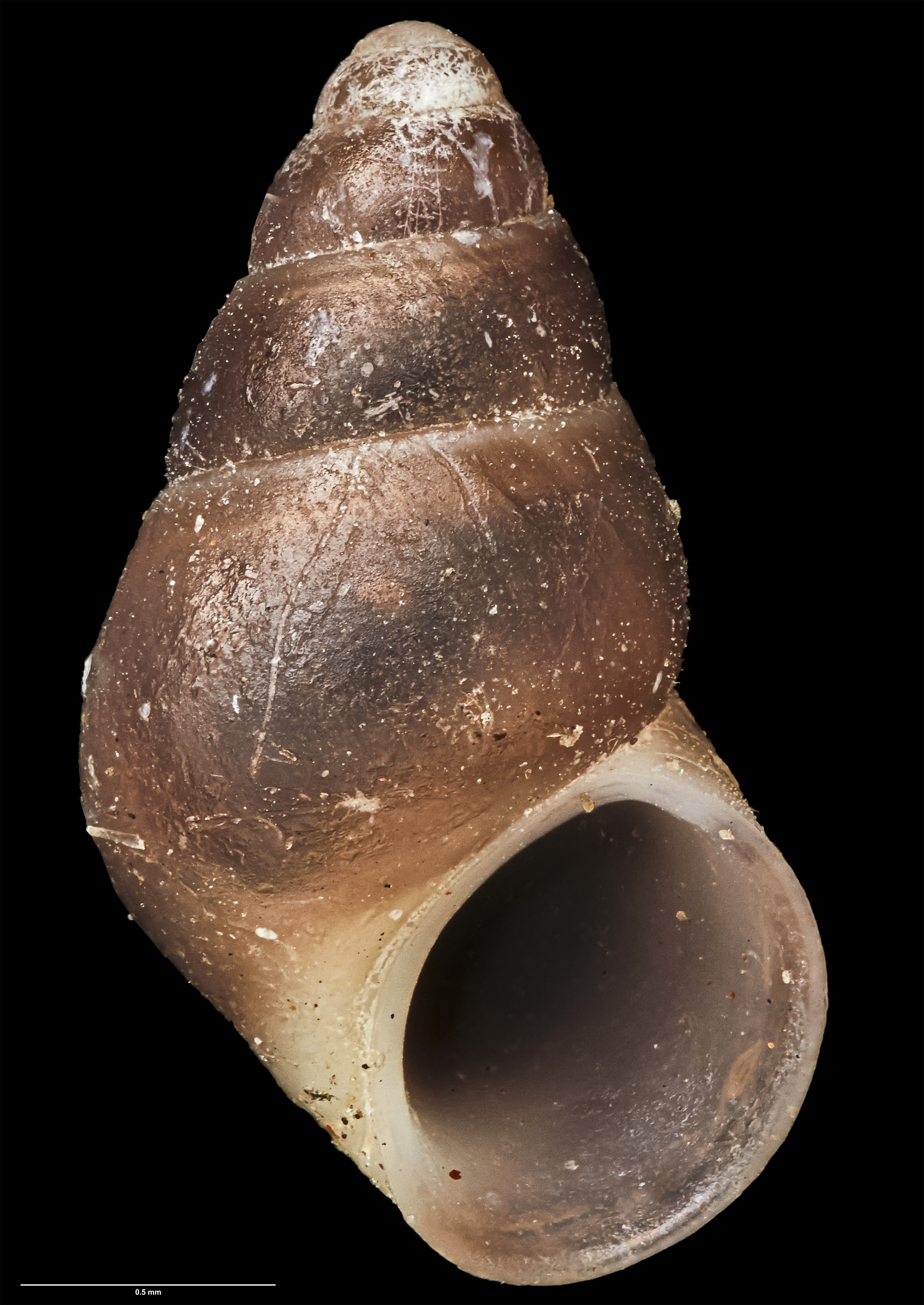
- Holotype of Eatoniella albocolumella from Auckland War Memorial Museum

Scientific classification
- Kingdom: Animalia
- Phylum: Mollusca
- Class: Gastropoda
- Subclass: Caenogastropoda
- Order: Littorinimorpha
- Superfamily: Cingulopsoidea
- Family: Eatoniellidae
- Genus: Eatoniella
- Species: E. albocolumella

Binomial name
- Eatoniella albocolumella Ponder, 1965

Synonyms
- Eatoniella (Abscindostoma) albocolumella Ponder, 1965

= Eatoniella albocolumella =

Species of gastropod

Eatoniella albocolumella is a species of marine gastropod mollusc in the family Eatoniellidae. It was first described by Winston Ponder in 1965. It is endemic to New Zealand, found in the waters of the North Island, northern and eastern coasts of the South Island, and in the Chatham Islands.

== Description ==
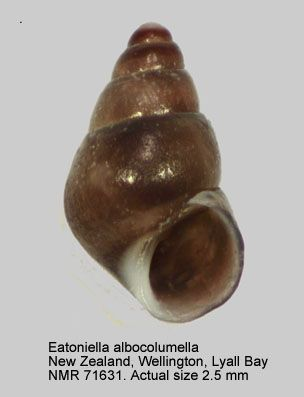
Type specimen collected in Lyall Bay, Wellington

In the original description, Ponder described the species as follows:

Shell small, thin, semi-transparent, smooth, shining, imperforate variably coloured. Spire tall, conical, with straight outlines; whorls 5, lightly convex, false margined; protoconch moderately large, smooth, of similar colour to spire whorls, not distinctly marked off; body whorl with a rounded periphery and base. Aperture moderately large, oval; peristome continuous, weakly thickened; outer lip sharp, thickened! a little posteriorly and internally, strongly and broadly excavated. Inner lip evenly concave and produced a little below. A narrow groove in umbilical region, but no umbilicus. Colour variable, usually dark purplish grey, sometimes uniform as in the holotype, except for the lower part of the base and columella which are always white. Usually with a series of irregular white blotches below sutures and/or on periphery, these frequently becoming broadly developed as irregular white zig-zag markings. There is great variation within populations, all intergradations between nearly pure white shells and uniform dark shells occur.

The species' animal has long cephalic tentacles, is colourless, and has a short, blobed snout with an orange buccal mass. The operculum is oval, curved and yellow. E. albocolumella measures 2.37 mm (0.093 in) by 1.35 mm (0.053 in). The species' colour pattern is highly variable, and is typically dark purple-grey, except for the white lower base and columella.

The species resembles E. limbata, but can be distinguished due to the thin shell and strongly reflected outer lip of E. albocolumella, and due to E. albocolumella having more irregular markings and a white umbilical region. It has a similar shape to E. lutea, but can be distinguished due to being smaller, and due to E. lutea having a more consistent colour pattern across individuals.

== Taxonomy ==
The species was first described by Winston Ponder in 1965, who used the name Eatoniella (Abscindostoma) albocolumella. The modern formatting of the name without a subgenus, Eatoniella albocolumella, was established by Hamish Spencer and Richard C. Willan in 1995. The holotype of the species was collected by W.J. Ballantine on 16 February 1964, on coralline algae at Cape Campbell in the Marlborough District of the South Island of New Zealand. It is held by the Auckland War Memorial Museum.

== Distribution and habitat ==
The species is Endemic to New Zealand, found in the waters of the North Island, Chatham Islands, and the northern and eastern coasts of the South Island. E. albocolumella is one of the most commonly found micromolluscs in the Kawhia Harbour.

The species is often found living on the surface of seaweeds, including low tide seaweeds, and is often abundantly found on coralline algae and short turf algae on exposed coasts, and more rarely under stones or on moderately exposed brown algae.
