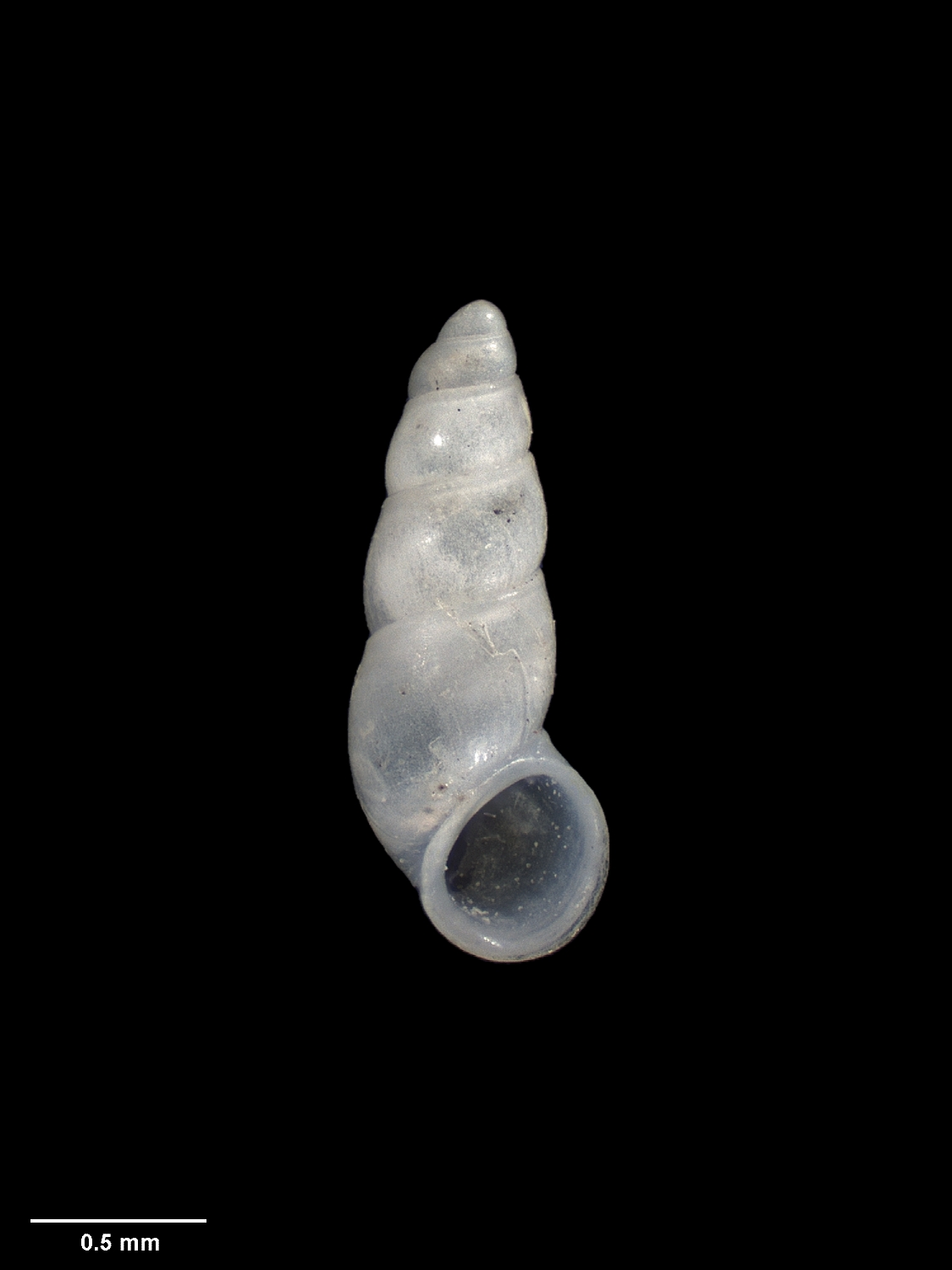

Scientific classification
- Kingdom: Animalia
- Phylum: Mollusca
- Class: Gastropoda
- Subclass: Caenogastropoda
- Order: Littorinimorpha
- Family: Eatoniellidae
- Genus: Pupatonia
- Species: P. pupinella

Binomial name
- Pupatonia pupinella Finlay, 1927

= Pupatonia pupinella =

Species of Pupatonia

Pupatonia pupinella is a species of snail in the genus Pupatonia.
