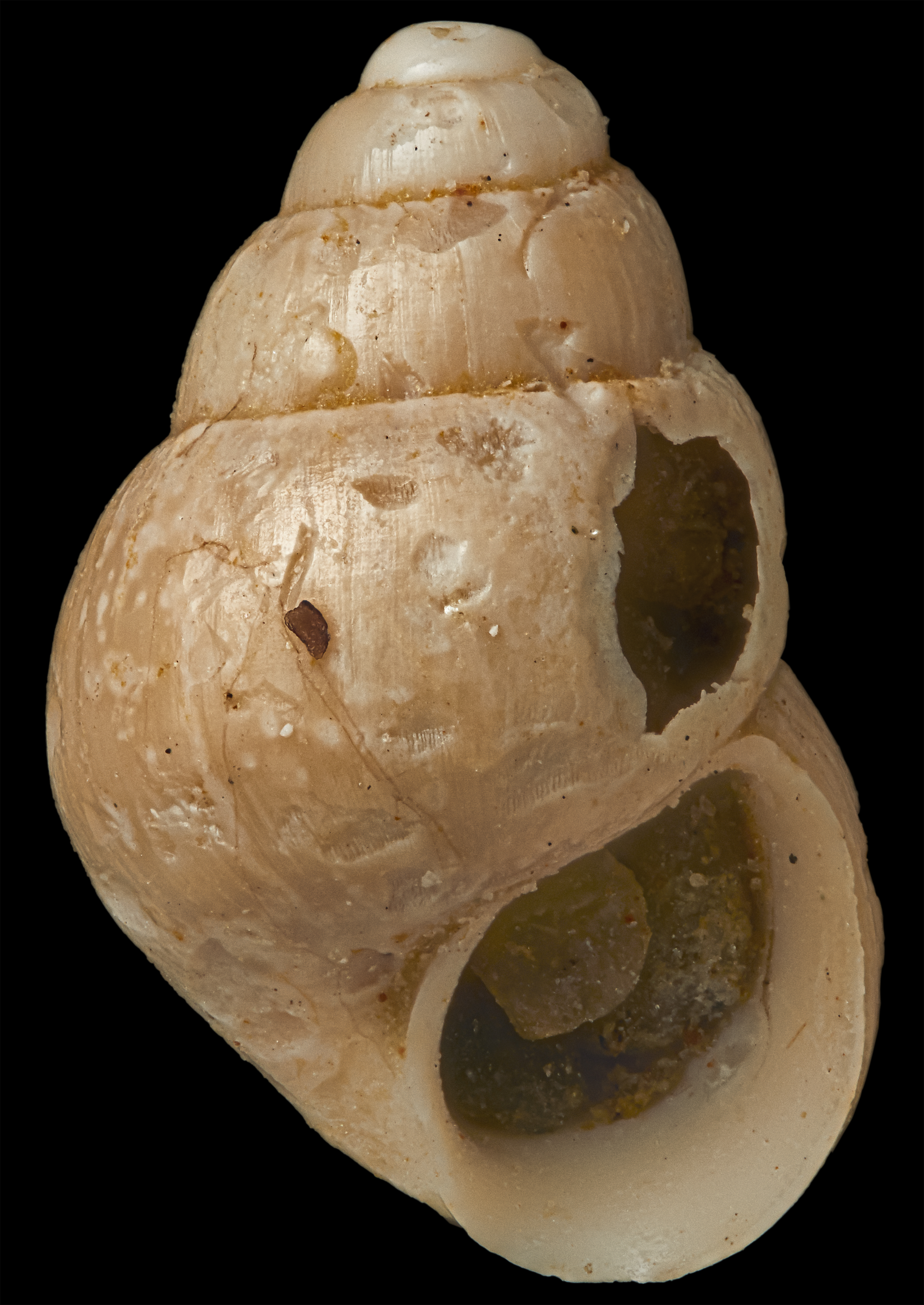
- Holotype of Powellisetia paroeca from Auckland War Memorial Museum

Scientific classification
- Kingdom: Animalia
- Phylum: Mollusca
- Class: Gastropoda
- Subclass: Caenogastropoda
- Order: Littorinimorpha
- Family: Rissoidae
- Genus: Powellisetia
- Species: †P. paroeca

Binomial name
- †Powellisetia paroeca (Finlay, 1924)

Synonyms
- Notosetia prisca paroeca Finlay, 1924

= Powellisetia paroeca =

Species of gastropod

Powellisetia paroeca is an extinct species of marine gastropod mollusc in the family Rissoidae. First described by Harold John Finlay in 1924, it is known to have lived in New Zealand during the early Miocene.

== Taxonomy ==
The species was identified in 1924 by Harold John Finlay as a subspecies of Powellisetia prisca, and later described as a species in its own right.

== Description ==
Finlay described both Powellisetia paroeca and Powellisetia prisca as follows:

Shell minute, ovate, body-whorl large in proportion to rest of shell. Sculpture of faint growth-lines; at somewhat regular distances some appear more prominent, but are not raised; a faint furrow emerges from suture on body-whorl and marks periphery. Spire very little higher than aperture. Protoconch of 1½ smooth and polished whorls, marked off by a groove from whorls proper, of which there are 3, lightly convex, body-whorl very slightly subangled for a short distance in front of suture, which is deep and channelled. Aperture oval, oblique, angled above. Peristome discontinuous, outer lip with prominent varix behind, but sharp edge; slightly effuse basally, and angulated medially. Columella short, arcuate, rounded. Inner lip distinctly callous but not covering the narrow elongated umbilical chink.

Finlay noted some differences between the two groups, namely that Powellisetia paroeca "...differs from the species only in slightly higher spire and more regularly curved outer lip, which slants downwards from suture without any medial angulation."

== Distribution ==
Fossils of the species have only been identified in New Zealand. The holotype was collected from sandstone at Calamity Point in Clifden, Southland, which dates to the early Miocene era.
