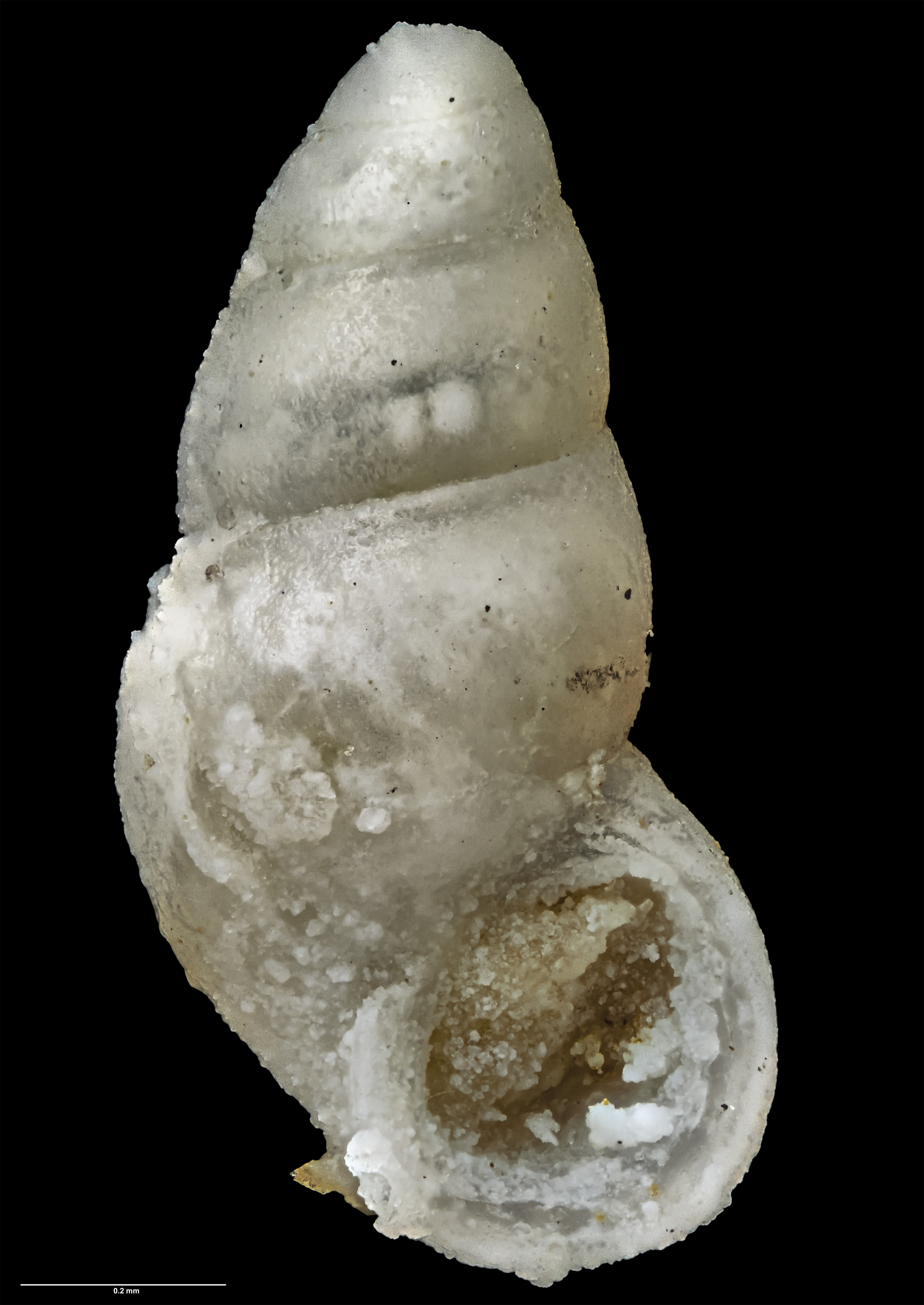
- Holotype of Pupatonia gracilispira from Auckland War Memorial Museum

Scientific classification
- Kingdom: Animalia
- Phylum: Mollusca
- Class: Gastropoda
- Subclass: Caenogastropoda
- Order: Littorinimorpha
- Family: Eatoniellidae
- Genus: Pupatonia
- Species: P. gracilispira

Binomial name
- Pupatonia gracilispira (Powell, 1933)

Synonyms
- Estea gracilispira Powell, 1933

= Pupatonia gracilispira =

Species of gastropod

Pupatonia gracilispira is a species of marine gastropod mollusc in the family Eatoniellidae. First described by Baden Powell in 1933 as Estea gracilispira, it is endemic to the waters of New Zealand.

== Description ==
Powell described the species as follows:

Shell minute, elongate-oval, semi-transparent, white, polished, thin and fragile. Whorls 4½, including low dome-shaped smooth protoconch, which is not clearly marked off from the post-nuclear whorls. Apart from very faint obliquely retractive growth striae there is no sculpture, the surface of all whorls being smooth and glossy. The suture is false-margined by the base of the preceding whorl showing through. Spire tali, 1½ times height of aperture. Aperture almost circular. Peristome continuous, dilated slightly over the basal and columellar portions and adnate across parietal wall as a distinct connecting callus. In profile the outer lip is straight with the axis of the whorls. There is no true umbilical chink, but there is a slight cavity owing to the overhanging nature of the columellar lip.

Pupatonia gracilispira measures 1.1 mm (0.043 in) by 0.525 mm (0.0207 in). The species is similar in appearance to Pupatonia mimitula, but differs by having a narrower spire, and by having a smooth and polished texture.

== Distribution ==
The species is endemic to New Zealand. The holotype and four paratypes were collected by either Powell himself or by C. A. Fleming in February 1933, from a depth of 18 metres off Owenga Beach in the Chatham Islands. The species has almost exclusively been identified in the Chatham Islands, however has also been identified at Waipapa Point in the south of the South Island, and the Auckland Islands.
