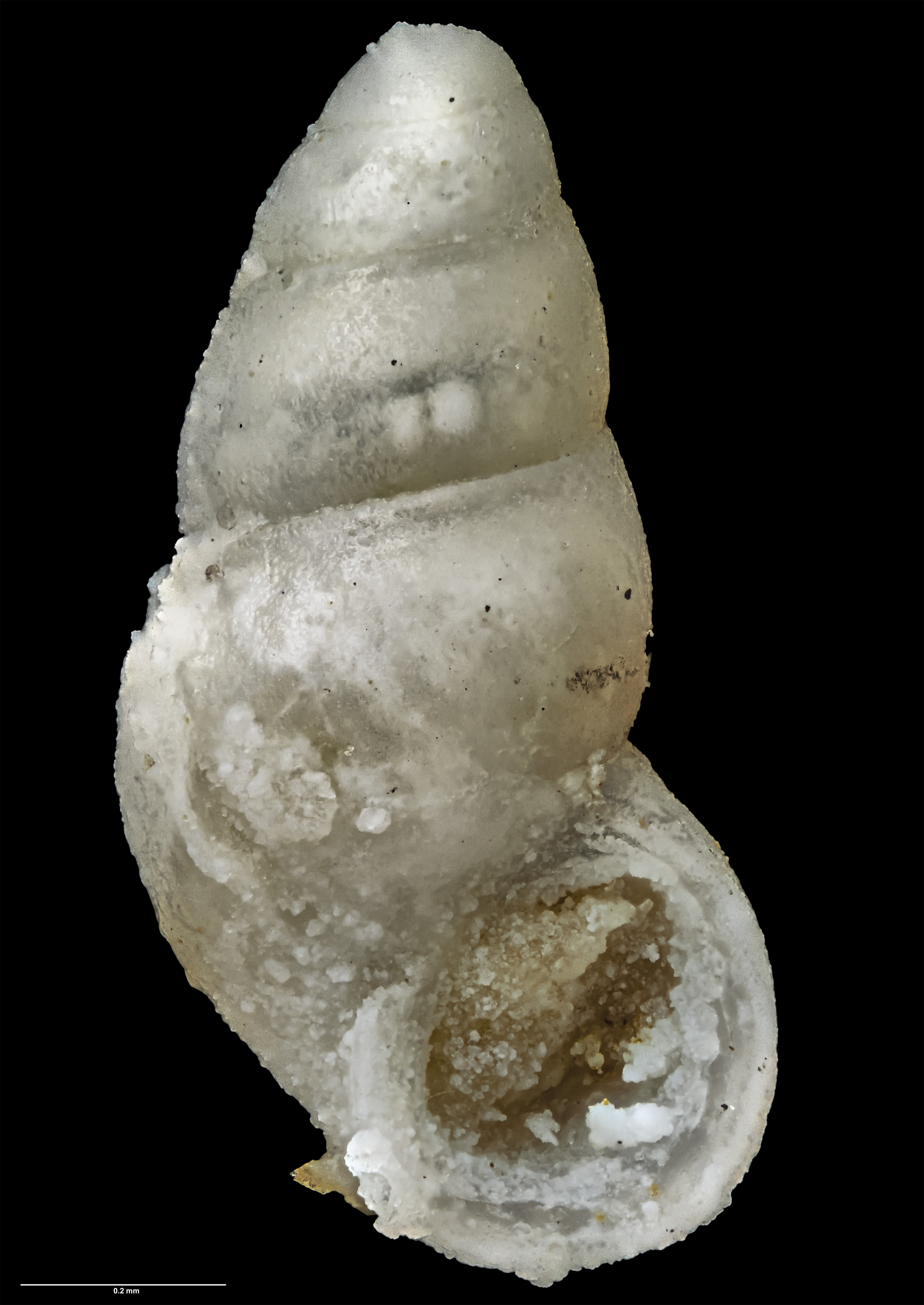
- Pupatonia gracilispira

Scientific classification
- Kingdom: Animalia
- Phylum: Mollusca
- Class: Gastropoda
- Subclass: Caenogastropoda
- Order: Littorinimorpha
- Family: Eatoniellidae
- Genus: Pupatonia; Ponder, 1965

Type species
- Estea minutula Powell, 1933

= Pupatonia =

Genus of gastropods

Pupatonia is a genus of minute sea snails, marine gastropod mollusks in the family Eatoniellidae, the eatoniellids. Members of the genus are found in southern mainland New Zealand, the New Zealand Subantarctic Islands, and southern South America.

== Description ==
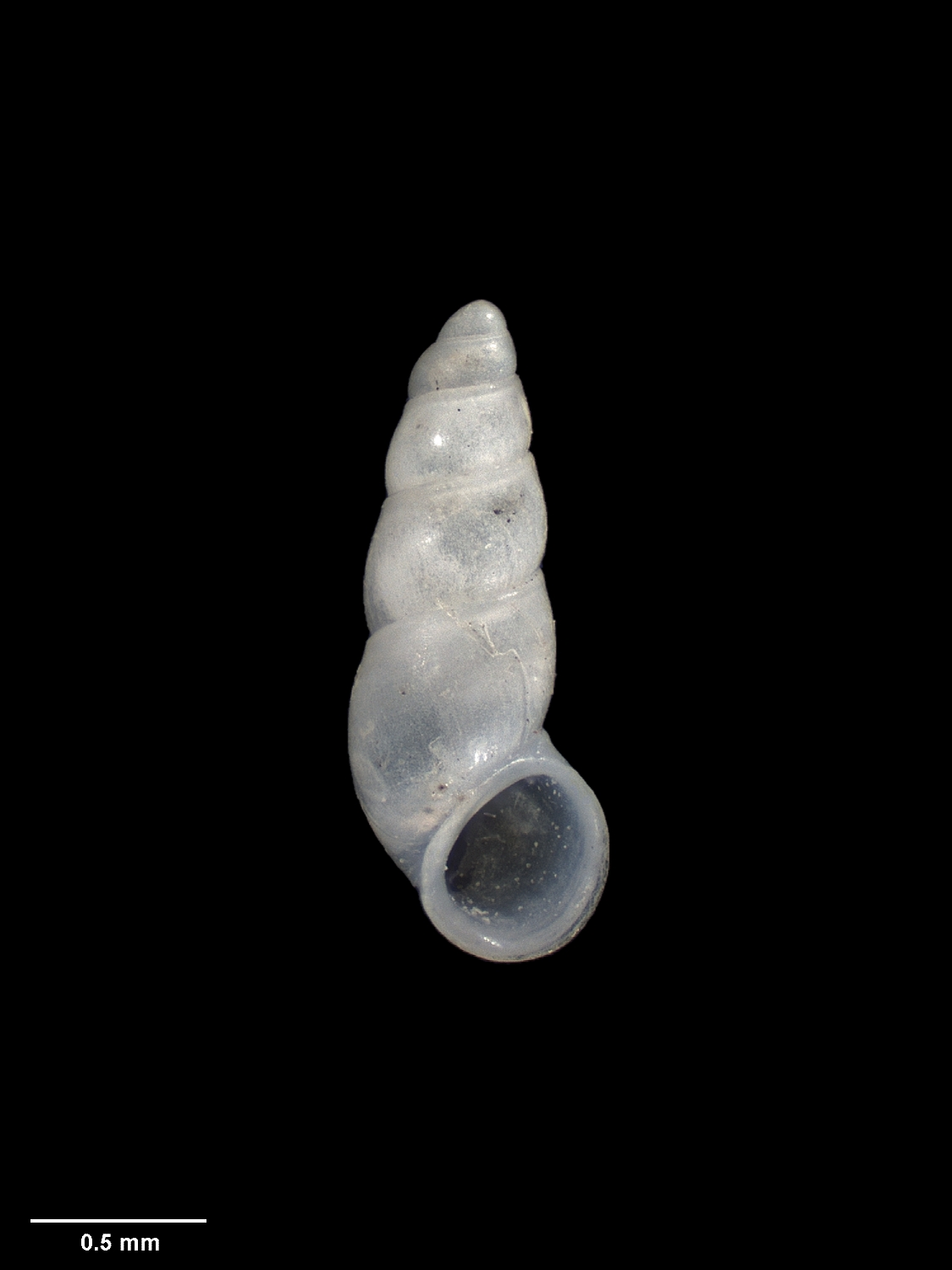
Neotype of Pupatonia pupinella

In the original description, Ponder described Pupatonia as follows:

Shell pupate, minute, white, solid: aperture ovate, peristome thickened, outer lip bent downwards at suture, sculpture of fine, close, spiral lines, Imperforate. Though superficially similar to Microedryas Laseron, Pupatonia differs in having a thicker shell, a different aperture, and less definite sculpture. Whereas Microdryas is related to the Estea-Scrobs group, Pupatonia is probably an eatoniellid. Animal, radula and operculum unknown.

Members of the genus range from minute to small in size, and have white, solid shells which are either smooth or have fine spiral lines. Members of Pupatonia typically have an outer shell lip that bends downwards at the shell's suture.

== Taxonomy ==
The genus and species was first described by Winston Ponder in 1965, who named Estea minutula (now Pupatonia minutula) as the type species. The holotype of P. gracilispira is held by the Auckland War Memorial Museum, P. minutula by the Canterbury Museum, P. atoma by the National Institute of Water and Atmospheric Research of New Zealand, and P. magellanica by the Natural History Museum of Los Angeles County. The neotype of P. pupinella is held by Te Papa. Originally thought to only occur around New Zealand, a South American species was identified in 1994.

== Distribution ==
Most members of Pupatonia are found in southern mainland New Zealand and the New Zealand Subantarctic Islands. P. magellanica is found off the coast of southern South America.

== Species ==
Species within the genus Pupatonia include:

- Pupatonia atoma Ponder, 1965
- Pupatonia gracilispira (Powell, 1933)
- Pupatonia magellanica Ponder & Worsfold, 1994
- Pupatonia minutula (Powell, 1933)
- Pupatonia pupinella (Finlay, 1927)
