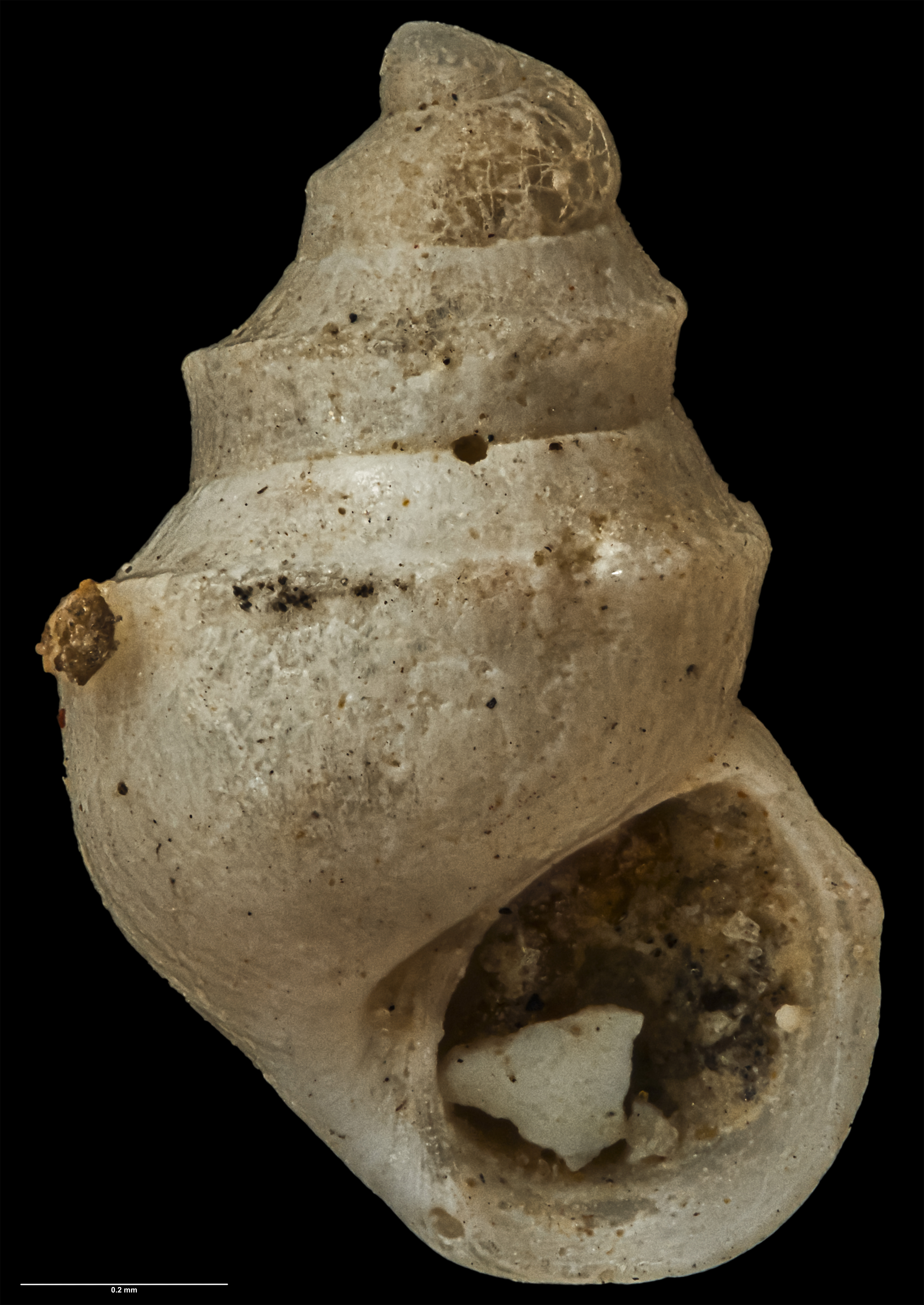
- Holotype of Powellisetia unicarinata from Auckland War Memorial Museum

Scientific classification
- Kingdom: Animalia
- Phylum: Mollusca
- Class: Gastropoda
- Subclass: Caenogastropoda
- Order: Littorinimorpha
- Family: Rissoidae
- Genus: Powellisetia
- Species: P. unicarinata

Binomial name
- Powellisetia unicarinata (Powell, 1930)

Synonyms
- Notosetia unicarinata Powell, 1930

= Powellisetia unicarinata =

Species of gastropod

Powellisetia unicarinata is a species of marine gastropod mollusc in the family Rissoidae. First described by Powell in 1930 as Notosetia unicarinata, it is endemic to the waters of New Zealand.

== Description ==
The holotype measures 1.19 mm in height and 0.59 mm in diameter.

Powellisetia bilirata has a minute, roughly ovate shell with a single strong spiral ridge. It is coloured dull-white, has a strongly carinated shoulder, and weak angulation found in the lower body whorl. The species measures 1.19 mm (0.047 in), by 0.59 mm (0.023 in). The species' shell has a reasonably tall spire and a strongly tilted protoconch, and shell width is the major factor that varies between individuals in the species.

The species is similar in appearance to Powellisetia porcellanoides, but can be distinguished by its angled carnate shoulder.

(Original description) The shell is minute, solid, and roughly ovate in form, with a perforate base and a single strong spiral ridge that carinates the periphery. The spire rises slightly higher than the aperture and consists of four whorls, including a large, smooth protoconch of one and a half whorls. The protoconch is somewhat oblique and flattened at its apex.

The post-nuclear whorls are smooth and are traversed by a single strong, rounded spiral ridge that forms the peripheral carina. On the spire whorls, this ridge is situated approximately at the midline. The suture is distinctly impressed. Below the peripheral keel, the body whorl and the base are evenly convex.

The aperture is subcircular in shape. The peristome is discontinuous, though connected across the parietal wall by a slight callosity. The outer lip is simple and only slightly thickened, lacking both varices and internal duplication; it becomes faintly angled above where the peripheral carina terminates. The lower portion of the inner lip and the basal lip are evenly rounded, while the inner lip is separated from the base by a small crescent-shaped cavity.

The shell is dull white in colour.

== Taxonomy ==
Originally described as Notosetia unicarinata in 1930 by Powell, the species name was revised as Powellisetia unicarinata in 1965 by Winston Ponder.

== Distribution ==
The species is endemic to New Zealand. The holotype dredged by Powell in 1924, from a depth of 9–11 metres at Tryphena Bay on Great Barrier Island. It is found in the north-east of the North Island, as far north as Manawatāwhi / Three Kings Islands,
