= Notosetia neozelanica =

Scientific classification
- Kingdom: Animalia
- Phylum: Mollusca
- Class: Gastropoda
- Subclass: Vetigastropoda
- Family: incertae sedis
- Genus: Notosetia
- Species: N. neozelanica

Binomial name
- Notosetia neozelanica (Suter, 1898)

Synonyms
- Barleeia neozelanica Suter, 1898; Putilla neozelanica (Suter, 1898)

Species of gastropod

Notosetia neozelanica is a species of small sea snail, a marine gastropod mollusc, unassigned in the superfamily Seguenzioidea.

== Distribution ==
This marine species occurs off New Zealand.
