= Notosetia aoteana =

Scientific classification
- Kingdom: Animalia
- Phylum: Mollusca
- Class: Gastropoda
- Subclass: Vetigastropoda
- Family: incertae sedis
- Genus: Notosetia
- Species: N. aoteana

Binomial name
- Notosetia aoteana Powell, 1937

Synonyms
- Putilla aoteana (Powel, 1937)

Species of gastropod

Notosetia aoteana is a species of minute sea snail, a marine gastropod mollusc, unassigned in the superfamily Seguenzioidea.

== Distribution ==
This marine species occurs off New Zealand.
