= Powellisetia ponderi =

Scientific classification
- Kingdom: Animalia
- Phylum: Mollusca
- Class: Gastropoda
- Subclass: Caenogastropoda
- Order: Littorinimorpha
- Family: Rissoidae
- Genus: Powellisetia
- Species: P. ponderi

Binomial name
- Powellisetia ponderi Numanami, 1996

Synonyms
- Notosetia ponderi

Species of gastropod

Powellisetia ponderi is a species of small sea snail, a marine gastropod mollusc or micromollusc in the family Rissoidae.
