= Ponderinella ghanensis =

Scientific classification
- Kingdom: Animalia
- Phylum: Mollusca
- Class: Gastropoda
- Subclass: Caenogastropoda
- Order: Littorinimorpha
- Family: Elachisinidae
- Genus: Ponderinella
- Species: P. ghanensis

Binomial name
- Ponderinella ghanensis (Rolán & Ryall, 2000)

Synonyms
- Notosetia ghanensis Rolán & Ryall, 2000

Species of gastropod

Ponderinella ghanensis is a species of small sea snail, a marine gastropod mollusc or micromollusc in the family Elachisinidae.

== Distribution ==
This species occurs in the Atlantic Ocean off West Africa.
