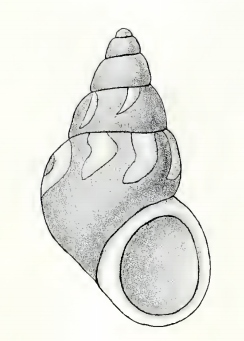
- Eatoniellidae

Scientific classification
- Kingdom: Animalia
- Phylum: Mollusca
- Class: Gastropoda
- Subclass: Caenogastropoda
- Order: Littorinimorpha
- Superfamily: Cingulopsoidea
- Family: Eatoniellidae; Ponder, 1965

Genera
- See text

= Eatoniellidae =

Family of gastropods

Eatoniellidae, commonly known as eatoniellids, are a taxonomic family of minute sea snails, marine gastropod molluscs in the superfamily Cingulopsoidea.

== Description ==
Eatoniellidae have a simple, conical shell. Typically both the shell and protoconch are smooth and, the protoconch is not distinct from the adult shell. Members of the family have a simple, ovate apterture which is not distinctly angled. The family can be identified due to members having a simple conical shell, a pegged oprtculum, 'littorinid'-type radula, opercular tentacles present in some species, aphallate males, and open prostrate and pallial oviduct.

== Taxonomy ==
The family was first described by Winston Ponder in 1965, who assigned the genus Eatoniella, originally described by William Healey Dall in 1876, as the type genus. Ponder also described three other genera in the Eatoniellidae family in the same paper: Crassitoniella, Eatoniella, Liratoniella and Pupatonia. According to taxonomy of the Gastropoda by Bouchet & Rocroi (2005) the family Eatoniellidae has no subfamilies.

== Ecology ==
Members of this family are typically found in cold, shallow waters primarily in the Southern Hemisphere, with the greatest species diversity found around the waters of New Zealand. Northern Hemisphere species are known from Japan, Sri Lanka and Hawaii. Eatoniellids live on algae, grazing and feeding on microdetritus. They are typically found in lower littoral and shallow sublittoral zones.

== Genera ==
Genera within the family Eatoniellidae include:

- Crassitoniella Ponder, 1965
- Eatoniella Dall, 1876
- Liratoniella Ponder, 1965
- Pupatonia Ponder, 1965

Genera brought into synonymy

- Eatonia E.A. Smith, 1875: synonym of Eatoniella Dall, 1876

== Gallery ==
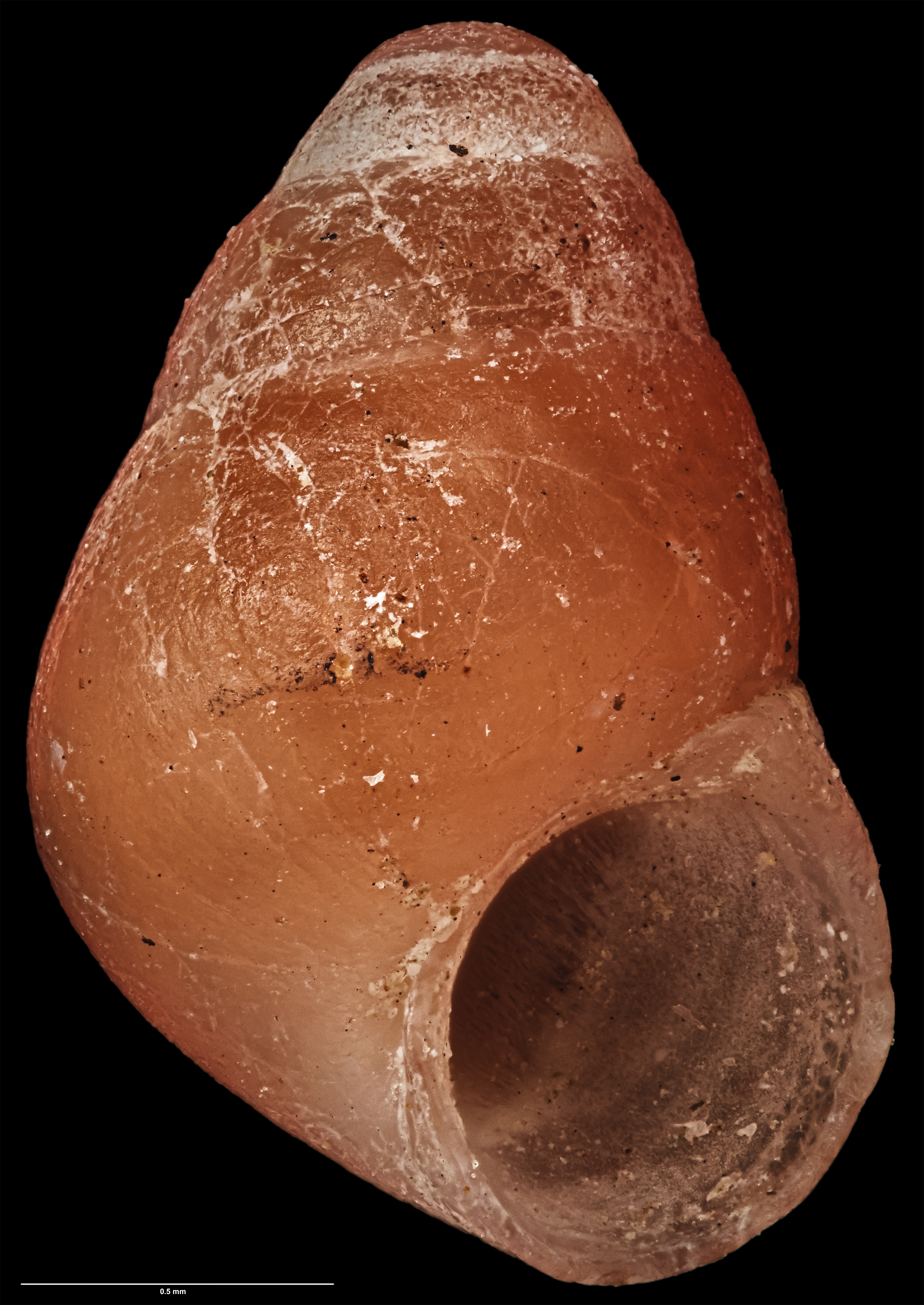
Crassitoniella carinata

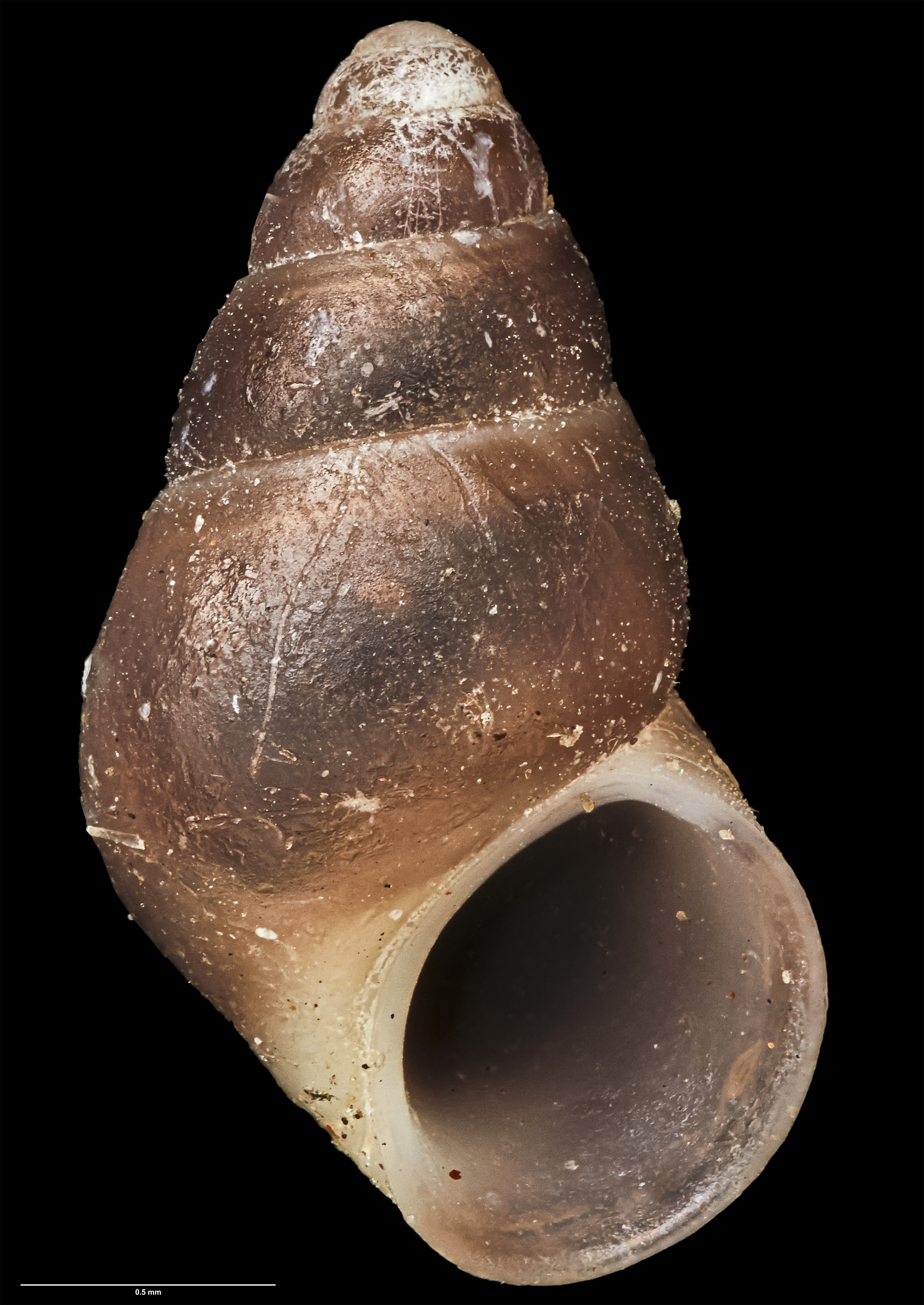
Eatoniella albocolumella

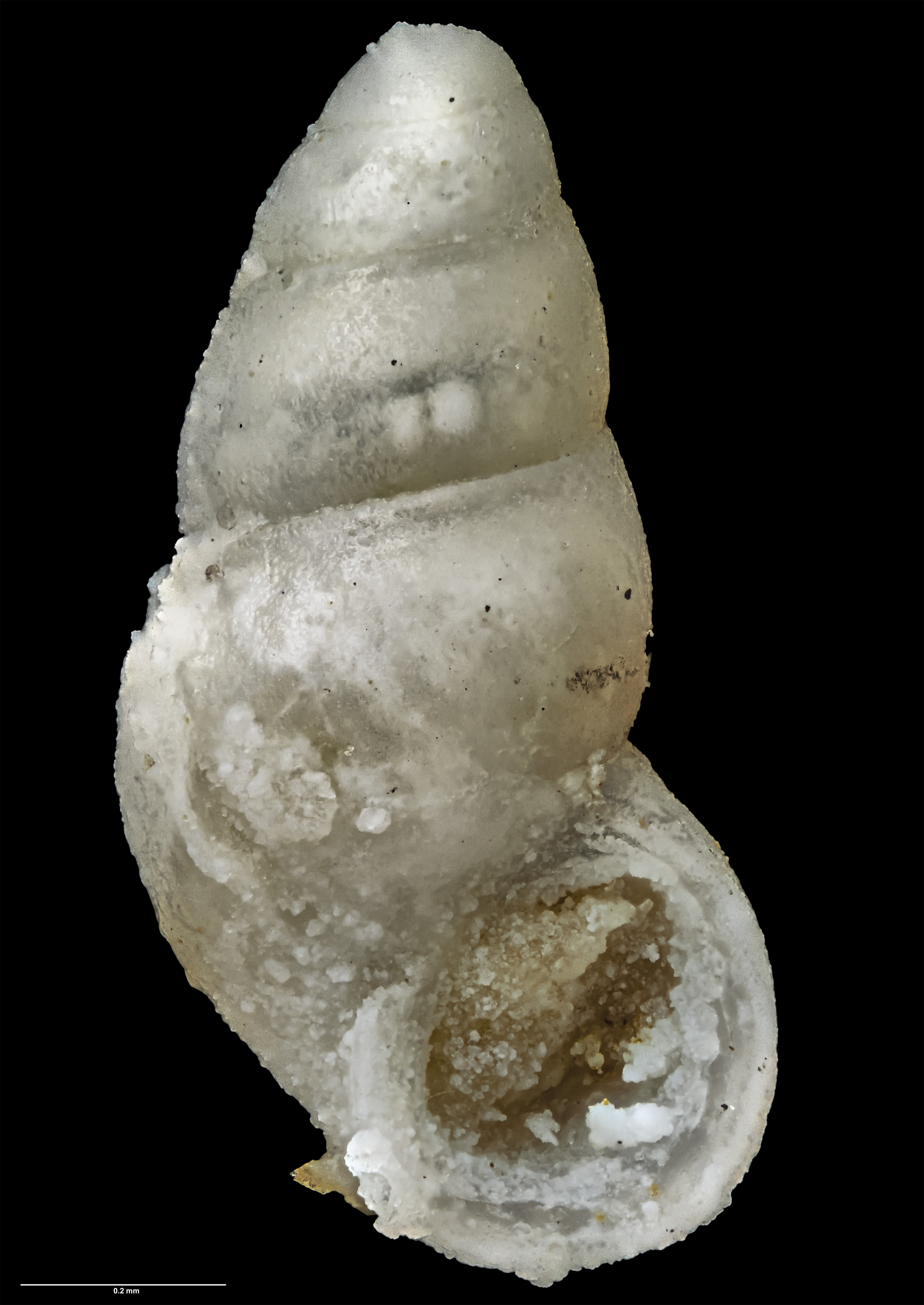
Pupatonia gracilispira

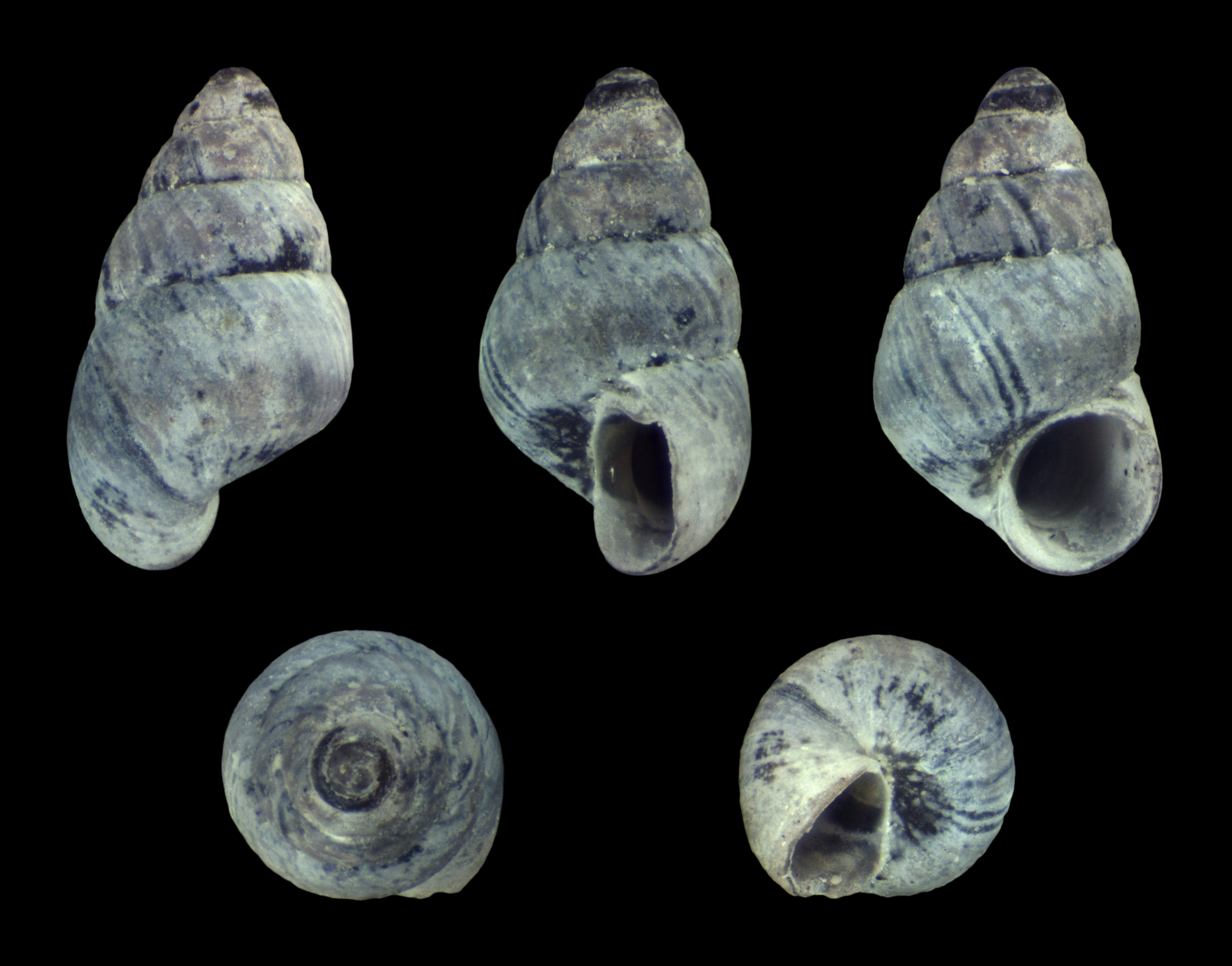
Eatoniella mortoni

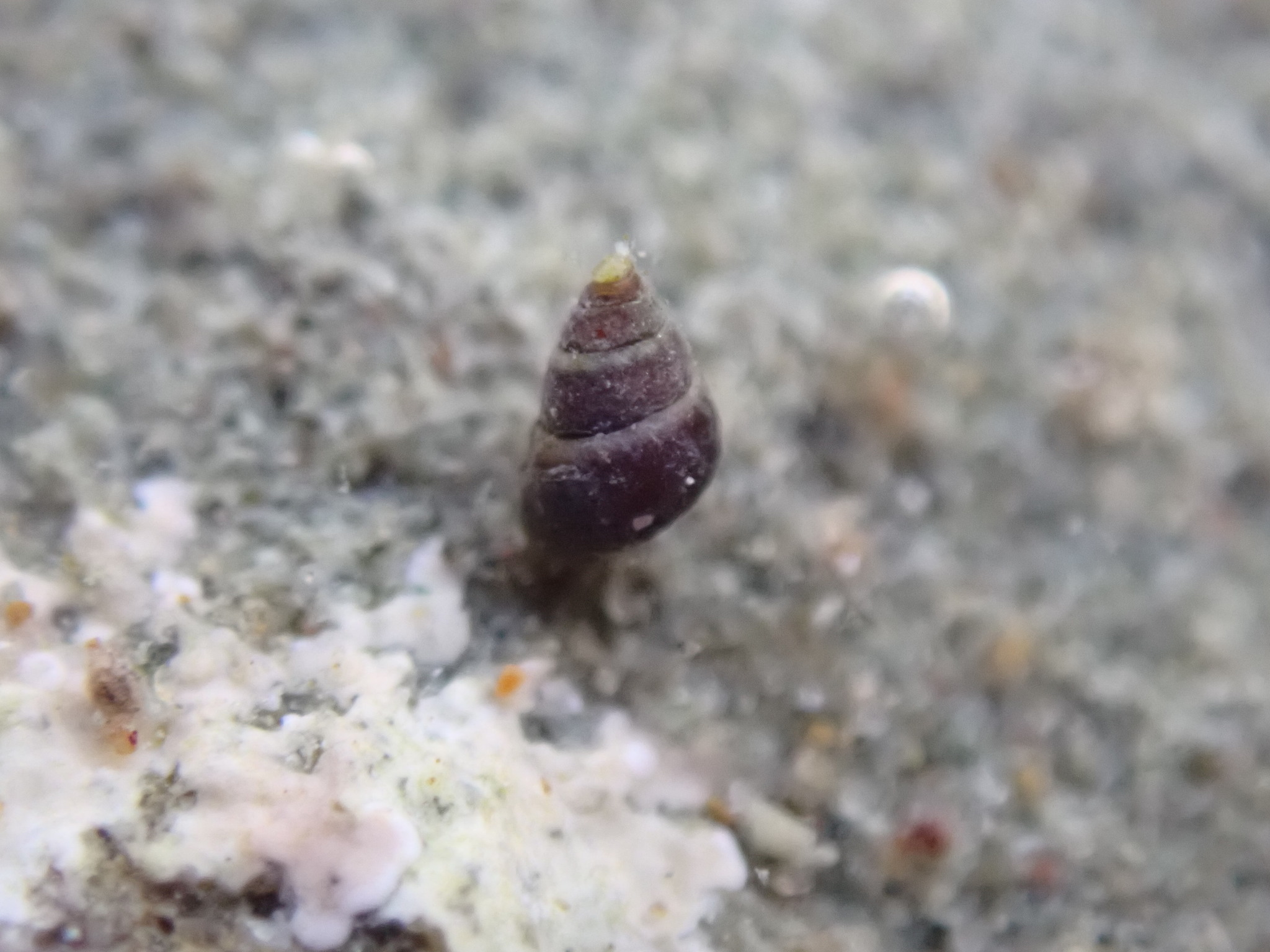
Living Eatoniella olivacea

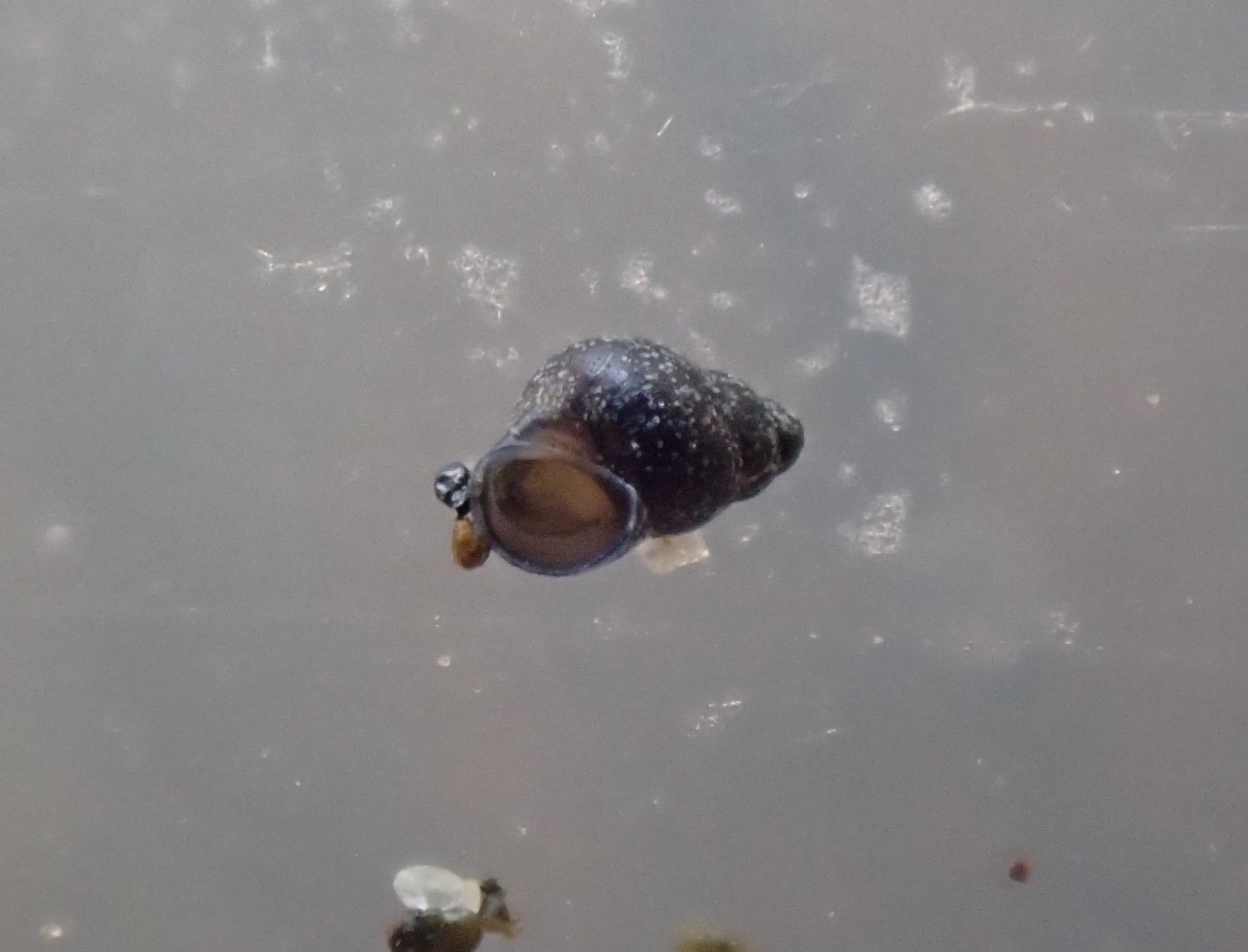
Underside of living Eatoniella olivacea
