= Triangulus =

There are several species names which are called "triangulus"; "triangulus" is Latin referring to triangles.

- Triangulus (crustacean), a barnacle genus in the family Lernaeodiscidae
- Amblyseius triangulus (A. triangulus), a species of mite
- Amphithalamus triangulus (A. triangulus), a species of snail in the genus Amphithalamus
- Archastes triangulus (A. triangulus), a species of beetle in the genus Archastes
- Cybaeus triangulus (C. triangulus), a species of spider in the genus Cybaeus
- Heishanobaatar triangulus (H. triangulus), an extinct Cretaceous period mammal species
- Psechrus triangulus (P. triangulus), a species of spider in the family Psechridae
- Potamonautes triangulus (P. triangulus), a species of crab in the genus Potamonautes
- Praealticus triangulus (P. triangulus), a species of fish
- Tigriopus triangulus (T. triangulus), a species of crustacean
- Trachygamasus triangulus (T. triangulus), a species of snail in the genus Trachygamasus
