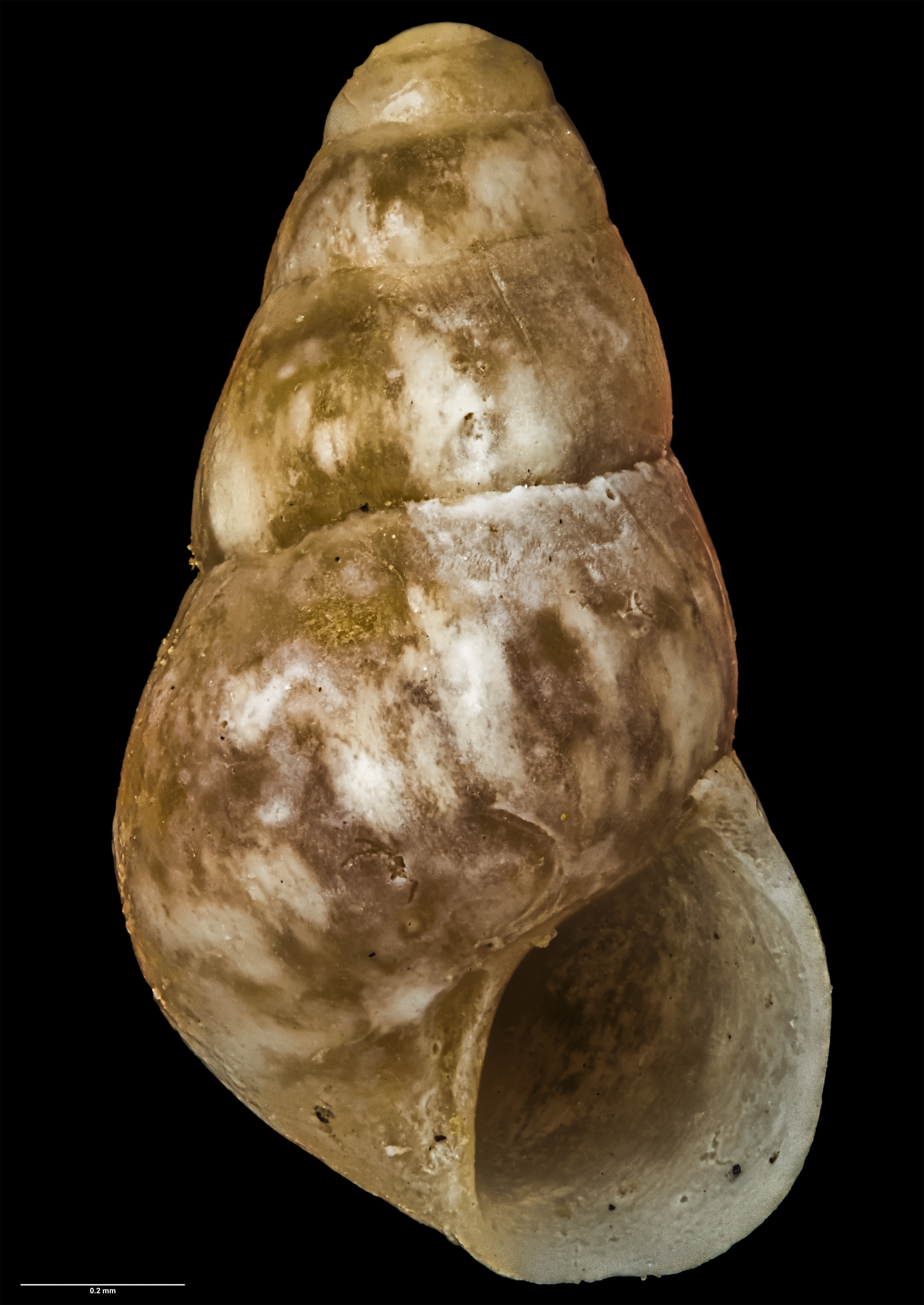
- Holotype of Tubbreva exaltata exaltata from Auckland War Memorial Museum

Scientific classification
- Kingdom: Animalia
- Phylum: Mollusca
- Class: Gastropoda
- Subclass: Caenogastropoda
- Order: Littorinimorpha
- Family: Cingulopsidae
- Genus: Tubbreva
- Species: T. exaltata

Binomial name
- Tubbreva exaltata (Powell, 1933)

Synonyms
- Notosetia exaltata Powell, 1933; Rufodardanula (Tubbreva) exaltata Ponder, 1965

= Tubbreva exaltata =

Species of gastropod

Tubbreva exaltata is a species of marine gastropod mollusc in the family Anabathridae. First described by Badwn Powell in 1933 as Notosetia exaltata, it is endemic to the waters of New Zealand. There are two subspecies, Tubbreva exaltata exaltata and Tubbreva exaltata sorenseni.

== Description ==
Powell described the species as follows:

Shell minute, elongate-conic, moderately solid. Coloured uniformly light-brown. Whorls 5, including low dome-shaped protoconch. Protoconch and the whole of the post-nuclear whorls smooth and polished. Spire elevated, conic, 1½ times height of aperture. Suture false-margined, due to the base of the previous whorl showing through, giving the appearance of a narrow subsutural band of darker brown. Aperture ovate-pyriform, comparatively small. Peristome discontinuous but united by an almost straight and upright columella, and a thin parietal callus, oblique in profile and inclined forwards above. There is a small crescentic umbilical chink. Outer lip thin and sharp, slightly adpressed at the suture.

T. exaltata exaltata is similar in appearance to T. exigua, but can be distinguished due to having flatter whorls, a heavier shell, and by being larger. The subspecies T. exaltata sorenseni has a shorter spire and a somewhat inflated body whorl relative to T. exaltata exaltata. T. exaltata exaltata measures 1.55 mm (0.061 in), by 0.9 mm (0.035 in), while T. exaltata sorenseni measures 1.125 mm (0.0443 in), by 0.775 mm (0.0305 in).

== Subspecies ==
In 1965, Winston Ponder reclassified the species Notosetia sorenseni (originally described by himself in 1955) as a subspecies of Tubbreva exaltata, due to the two groups' similar appearances. the new subspecies, now known by the name Tubbreva exaltata sorenseni, differs by having a shorter spire and relatively more inflated body whorl.

== Distribution ==
The species is endemic to New Zealand. The holotype was collected by either A.W.B. Powell or C.A. Fleming in February 1933, offshore from Owenga Beach in the Chatham Islands. It is found in the south of the South Island, the Chatham Islands and the New Zealand Subantarctic Islands, with specimens reported as far north as Taranaki on the west coast of the North Island.
