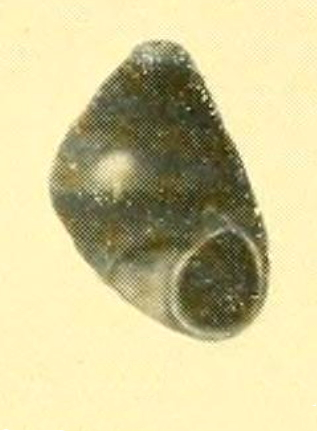
- Shell of Amphithalamus inclusus

Scientific classification
- Kingdom: Animalia
- Phylum: Mollusca
- Class: Gastropoda
- Subclass: Caenogastropoda
- Order: Littorinimorpha
- Family: Anabathridae
- Genus: Amphithalamus
- Species: A. inclusus

Binomial name
- Amphithalamus inclusus P. P. Carpenter, 1864

Synonyms
- Amphithalamus (Amphithalamus) inclusus P. P. Carpenter, 1864 alternative representation; Amphithalamus stephensae Bartsch, 1927 junior subjective synonym; Amphithalamus tenuis Bartsch, 1911; Amphithalamus trosti A. M. Strong & Hertlein, 1939

= Amphithalamus inclusus =

Species of gastropod

Amphithalamus inclusus is a species of minute sea snails, marine gastropod mollusks or micromollusks in the family Anabathridae.

== Description ==
The length of the shell attains 1.1 mm, its diameter 0.9 mm.

(Original description) The shell has the habit of a minute Stenothyra W. H. Benson, 1856; the outer lip is not contracted, but the columellar lip um in adults travels forward to meet it, leaving a chamber behind. The nucleus is cancellated, and the base is bluntly ribbed.

(Described as Amphithalamus stephensae) The shell is minute and pale brown with an ashy tinge, except for the columellar region, which is flesh-colored. When the animal is present, the early whorls appear much duskier. The nuclear whorls number 1.5; the first half is smooth, while the rest are marked by rather distantly spaced, poorly developed, rather broad spiral lirations, of which nine are present between the summit and the periphery. In addition to this, inconspicuous lines of growth are visible.

Post-nuclear whorls and sculpture: The post-nuclear whorls are strongly rounded and narrowly shouldered at the summit, with the portion appressed to the preceding whorl appearing as a band through the substance of the shell. The periphery features a weak keel that is truncated rather abruptly posteriorly but grades gently into the substance of the shell toward the base. The suture is well marked. The base is short, inflated, strongly rounded, and marked by lines of growth only. A heavy callus is present at the insertion of the columella, which at its posterior termination almost forms a cord. The columella itself is very heavy and oblique.

Aperture and operculum: The conformation of the aperture is characteristically Amphithalmid; that is, the aperture, which is oval, is much contracted by a shelf extending out from the columellar and parietal wall toward the outer lip, thus contracting the aperture. This shelf forms a decided pit behind its edge. The inner and parietal lip of the aperture, therefore, are not in contact with the columellar or parietal wall, but are at some distance from it. The posterior portion of the outer lip, however, extends upward to the preceding turn, which it joins immediately below the peripheral keel, as in mollusks with a normal aperture. The operculum is thin and paucispiral.

== Distribution ==
This species occurs off the western coast of North America.
