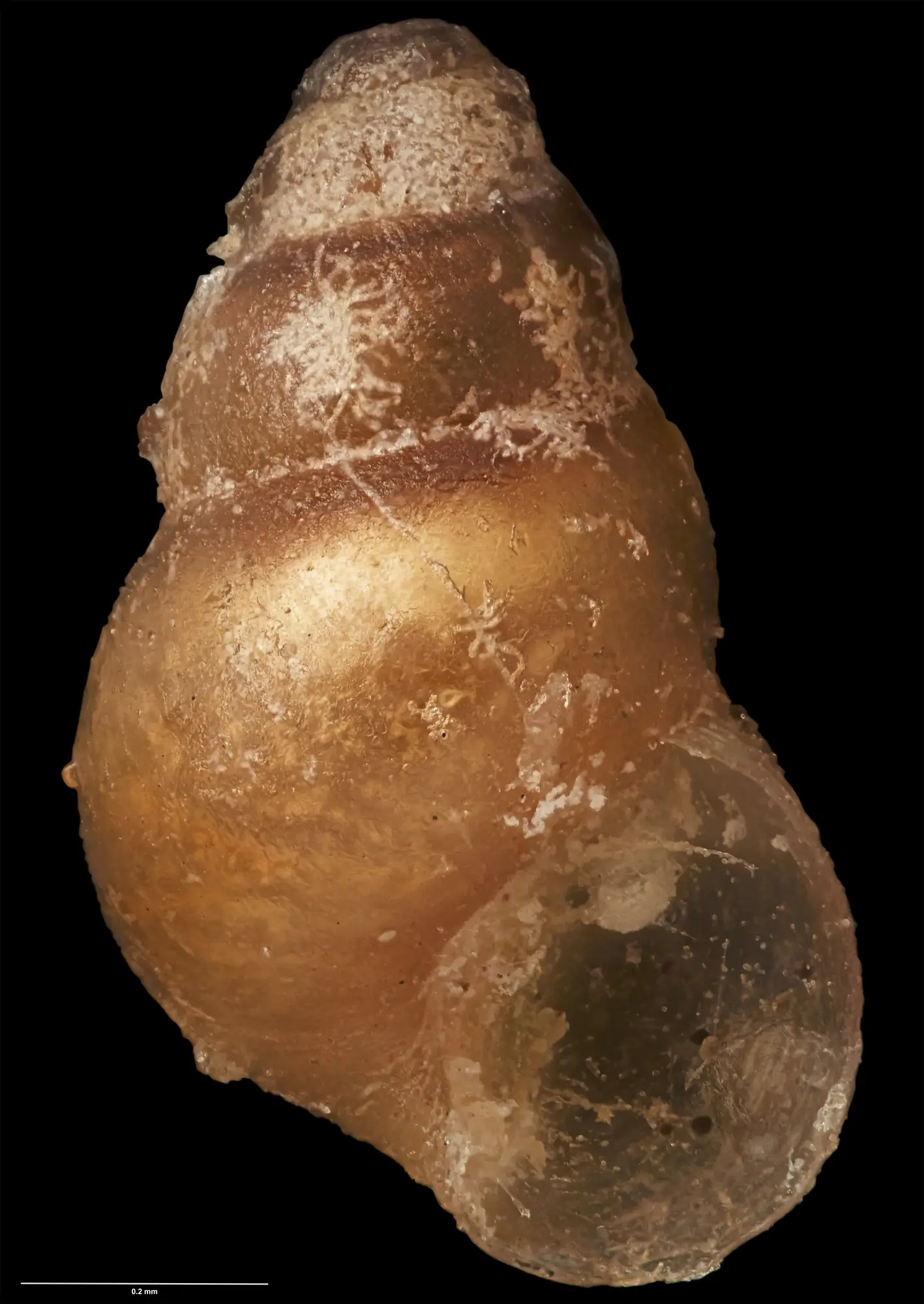
- Holotype of Tubbreva exigua

Scientific classification
- Kingdom: Animalia
- Phylum: Mollusca
- Class: Gastropoda
- Subclass: Caenogastropoda
- Order: Littorinimorpha
- Family: Cingulopsidae
- Genus: Tubbreva; Ponder, 1965

Type species
- Rufodardanula (Tubbreva) exigua (Ponder, 1965)

Synonyms
- Rufodardanula (Tubbreva) Ponder, 1965

= Tubbreva =

Genus of gastropods

Tubbreva is a genus of taxonomic family of minute sea snails, marine gastropod molluscs belonging to the family Cingulopsidae. First described by Winston Ponder in 1965, the genus is known to occur in the Pacific Ocean and the Mediterranean Sea.

== Description ==
In the original description, Ponder described the genus as below:

Shell very similar to Rufodardanula, though often more elongate and imperforate.

Operculum: Similar to that of R. (R.) spadix, but has a very short, almost rudimentary peg, which is only slightly thickened, and has a more expanded columella edge.

Radula: Very minute or absent as it has defied ail attempts at mounting. Until anatomical and radula characters are known, Tubbreva is considered to be subgeneric to Rufodardanula.

Members of the genus have minute shells, are elongately conical, thin and smooth. Tubbreva has almost straight non-umbilicate columella with a weak bulge, and a thin, oval operculum that lacks an internal ridge. Additionally, the operculum has a very short peg that does not project beyond the margin and no radula.

== Taxonomy ==
Tubbreva was first described by Winston Ponder in 1965 as a subgenus of Rufodardanula. Ponder named Tubbreva exigua as the type species. In 1980, the taxon was raised to genus level by Ponder and E. K. Yoo. Due to the genus' distribution in the Mediterranean and the Pacific, Ponder suggested that the genus was found in the prehistoric Tethys Ocean, before the ocean was spit apart.

Phylogenetic analysis places Tubbreva within the Cingulopsoidea superfamily, being more closely related to Eatonina than genera such as Skenella, Eatoniella or Crassitoniella.

== Distribution ==
Tubbreva is found in the waters of the Pacific including Australia and New Zealand, Japan, and the Mediterranean Sea. Fossils of the Chattian species T. chattica have been found near Saint-Paul-lès-Dax in southwestern France.

== Species ==
Species within the genus Tubbreva include:

- † Tubbreva chattica Lozouet, 1998
- Tubbreva exaltata (Powell, 1933)
- Tubbreva exigua (Ponder, 1965)
- Tubbreva insignificans (Ponder & Yoo, 1981)
- Tubbreva micrometrica (Aradas & Benoit, 1876)
- Tubbreva minutula (Powell, 1937)
- Tubbreva parva (Ponder & Yoo, 1981)
- Tubbreva sorenseni (A. W. B. Powell, 1955)

== Gallery ==
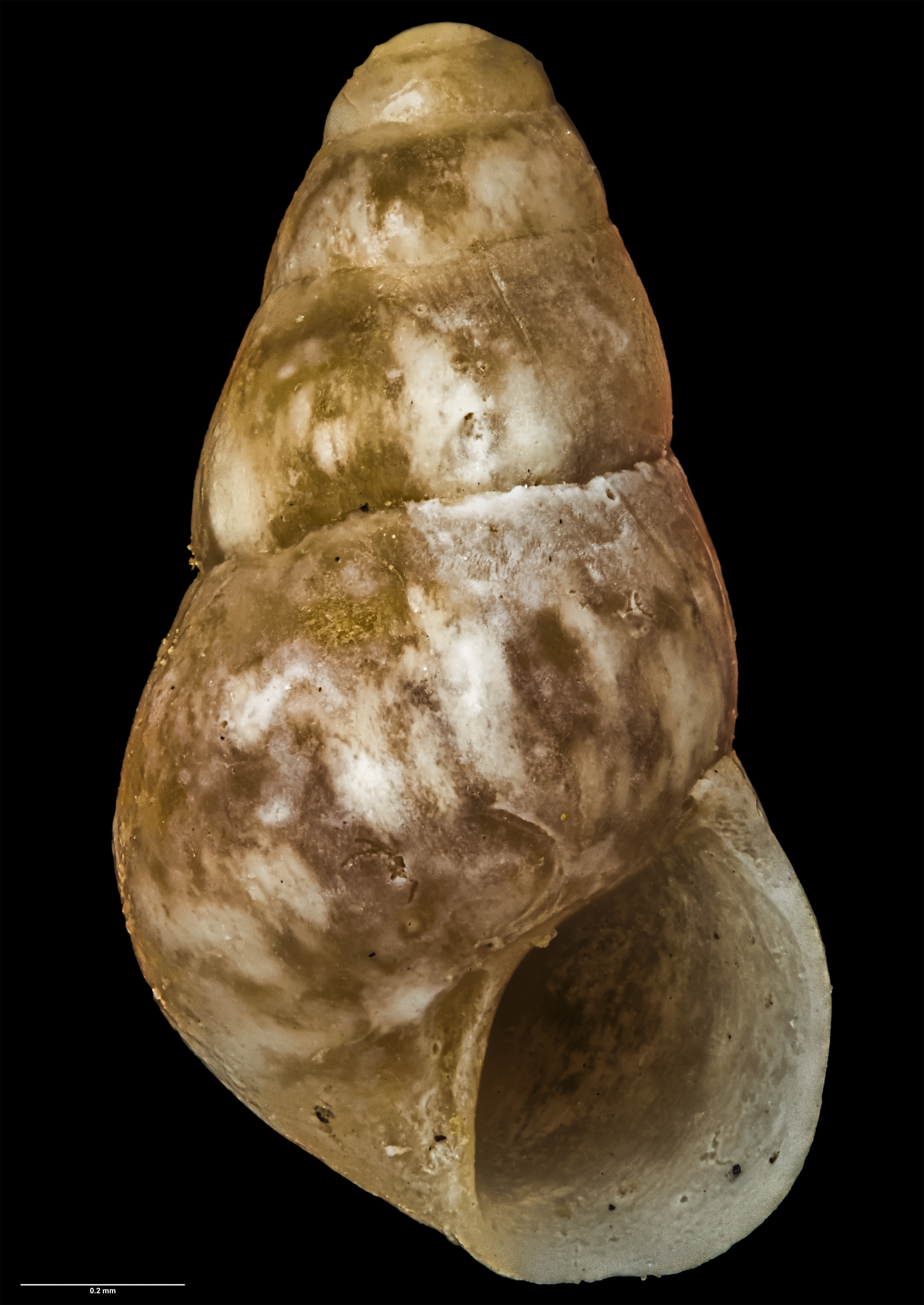
Tubbreva exaltata

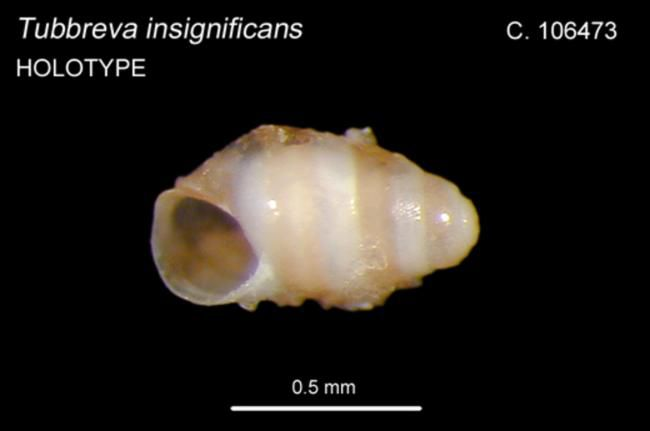
Tubbreva insignificans

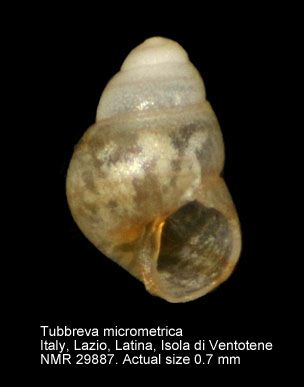
Tubbreva micrometrica
