= Amphithalamus neglectus =

Scientific classification
- Kingdom: Animalia
- Phylum: Mollusca
- Class: Gastropoda
- Subclass: Caenogastropoda
- Order: Littorinimorpha
- Family: Anabathridae
- Genus: Amphithalamus
- Species: A. neglectus

Binomial name
- Amphithalamus neglectus (W. H. Turton, 1932)

Synonyms
- Amphithalamus (Amphithalamus) neglectus (W. H. Turton, 1932) · alternative representation; Sabanaea neglecta W. H. Turton, 1932; Sabanea neglecta W. H. Turton, 1932 (original combination)

Species of gastropod

Amphithalamus neglectus is a species of minute sea snails, marine gastropod mollusks or micromollusks in the family Anabathridae.

== Distribution ==
This species occurs off Port Alfred, South Africa.
