= Skenella georgiana =

Scientific classification
- Kingdom: Animalia
- Phylum: Mollusca
- Class: Gastropoda
- Subclass: Caenogastropoda
- Order: Littorinimorpha
- Family: Cingulopsidae
- Genus: Skenella
- Species: S. georgiana

Binomial name
- Skenella georgiana Pfeffer, 1886

Synonyms
- Skenella (Skenella) georgiana Pfeffer, 1886

Species of gastropod

Skenella georgiana is a species of small sea snail, a marine gastropod mollusk in the family Cingulopsidae.

== Description ==
The maximum recorded shell length is 1.22 mm.

== Habitat ==
Minimum recorded depth is 16 m. Maximum recorded depth is 16 m.
