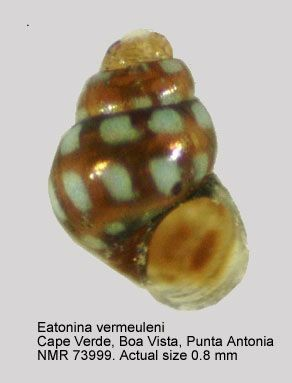

Scientific classification
- Kingdom: Animalia
- Phylum: Mollusca
- Class: Gastropoda
- Subclass: Caenogastropoda
- Order: Littorinimorpha
- Family: Cingulopsidae
- Genus: Eatonina
- Species: E. vermeuleni

Binomial name
- Eatonina vermeuleni Moolenbeek, 1986

= Eatonina vermeuleni =

Species of gastropod

Eatonina vermeuleni is a species of minute sea snail, a marine gastropod mollusk in the family Cingulopsidae.
