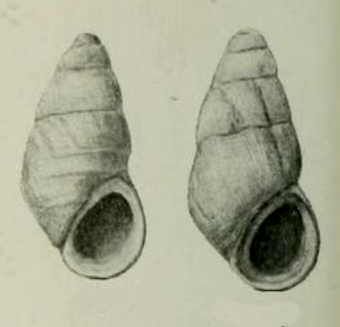
- Shells of Amphithalamus semen (holotype)

Scientific classification
- Kingdom: Animalia
- Phylum: Mollusca
- Class: Gastropoda
- Subclass: Caenogastropoda
- Order: Littorinimorpha
- Family: Anabathridae
- Genus: Amphithalamus
- Species: A. semen

Binomial name
- Amphithalamus semen (Odhner, 1924)

Synonyms
- Amphithalamus (Amphithalamus) semen (Odhner, 1924) alternative representation; Notoscrobs (Microfossa) semen (Odhner, 1924) (superseded combination); Rissoa semen Odhner, 1924 (superseded combination)

= Amphithalamus semen =

Species of gastropod

Amphithalamus semen is a species of minute sea snails, marine gastropod molluscs or micromolluscs in the family Anabathridae.

== Description ==
The length of the shell attains 1.5 mm, its diameter 0.7 mm.

(Original description) The shell is minute, elongate-ovate, solid, imperforate, and polished. Its sculpture varies from entirely smooth to showing traces of spiral striae; sometimes a pair of strong revolving keels are present in the periphery of the body whorl and an obscure one on the base. The colour is fulvous, somewhat lighter on the aperture side; the inner lip is reddish orange. The protoconch is finely spirally striated. The spire measures about 1.5 times the height of the aperture. The suture is shallow. Comprising five slightly convex whorls, margined at the suture, the body whorl is rounded in the periphery and flattened above and below. The aperture is broadly ovate, fulvous within; the peristome is thick, continuous, and double on account of a small swelling of the lip inside its edge. Its colour is white, except for the reddish-orange columellar lip, which is sunk and sharply set off from the body whorl. The columella is short and sinuous. The operculum is ovate with a thicker disc on the inside, the margin of which forms a crest along the columellar edge of the operculum.

== Distribution ==
This species is endemic to New Zealand and occurs off the Three Kings Islands, North Island and eastern South Island.
