= Amphithalamus semiornatus =

Scientific classification
- Kingdom: Animalia
- Phylum: Mollusca
- Class: Gastropoda
- Subclass: Caenogastropoda
- Order: Littorinimorpha
- Family: Anabathridae
- Genus: Amphithalamus
- Species: †A. semiornatus

Binomial name
- †Amphithalamus semiornatus (Laws, 1948)

Synonyms
- † Amphithalamus (Notoscrobs) semiornatus (Laws, 1948) alternative representation; † Notoscrobs semiornatus Laws, 1948 (superseded combination)

Species of gastropod

Amphithalamus semiornatus is an extinct species of minute sea snails, marine gastropod mollusks or micromollusks in the family Anabathridae.

== Distribution ==
Fossils of this species were found in Tertiary strata in Hokianga District, North Auckland, New Zealand.
