= Skenella edwardiensis =

Scientific classification
- Kingdom: Animalia
- Phylum: Mollusca
- Class: Gastropoda
- Subclass: Caenogastropoda
- Order: Littorinimorpha
- Family: Cingulopsidae
- Genus: Skenella
- Species: S. edwardiensis

Binomial name
- Skenella edwardiensis (Watson, 1886)

Synonyms
- Eatoniopsis edwardiensis (Watson, 1886); Rissoa edwardiensis Watson, 1886 (original combination); Skenella (Skenella) edwardiensis (Watson, 1886) · accepted, alternate representation

Species of gastropod

Skenella edwardiensis is a species of small sea snail, a marine gastropod mollusk or micromollusk in the family Cingulopsidae.
