= Amphithalamus glabrus =

Scientific classification
- Kingdom: Animalia
- Phylum: Mollusca
- Class: Gastropoda
- Subclass: Caenogastropoda
- Order: Littorinimorpha
- Family: Anabathridae
- Genus: Amphithalamus
- Species: A. glabrus

Binomial name
- Amphithalamus glabrus Simone, 1996

Species of gastropod

Amphithalamus glabrus is a species of minute sea snails, marine gastropod mollusks or micromollusks in the family Anabathridae.

== Distribution ==
This species occurs off São Paulo, Brazil.
