= Amphithalamus albus =

- Shell of Amphithalamus albus (paratype at Naturalis Biodiversity Center)

Scientific classification
- Kingdom: Animalia
- Phylum: Mollusca
- Class: Gastropoda
- Subclass: Caenogastropoda
- Order: Littorinimorpha
- Family: Anabathridae
- Genus: Amphithalamus
- Species: A. albus

Binomial name
- Amphithalamus albus Rolán, 1992

Species of gastropod

Amphithalamus albus is a species of a minute sea snail, marine gastropod mollusks or micromollusks in the family Anabathridae.

== Description ==
The length of the shell attains 0.88 mm.

== Distribution ==
This species occurs off Cuba.
