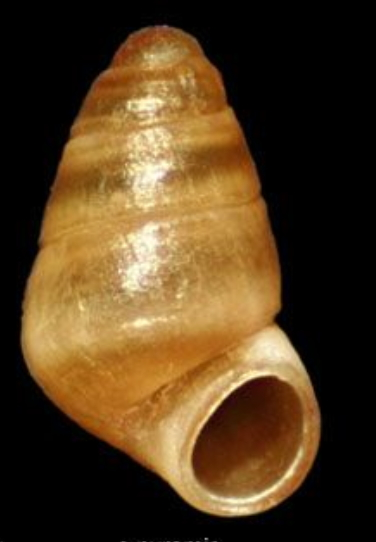
- Shell of Amphithalamus pyramis (specimen at the Natural History Museum, Rotterdam)

Scientific classification
- Kingdom: Animalia
- Phylum: Mollusca
- Class: Gastropoda
- Subclass: Caenogastropoda
- Order: Littorinimorpha
- Family: Anabathridae
- Genus: Amphithalamus
- Species: A. pyramis

Binomial name
- Amphithalamus pyramis (Laseron, 1950)

Synonyms
- Amphithalamus (Amphithalamus) pyramis (Laseron, 1950) alternative representation; Scrobs pyramis Laseron, 1950 (original combination)

= Amphithalamus pyramis =

Species of gastropod

Amphithalamus pyramis is a species of minute sea snails, marine gastropod mollusks or micromollusks in the family Anabathridae.

== Description ==
The length of the shell attains 2 mm.

== Distribution ==
This species is endemic to Australia and occurs off New South Wales, Queensland and Victoria.
