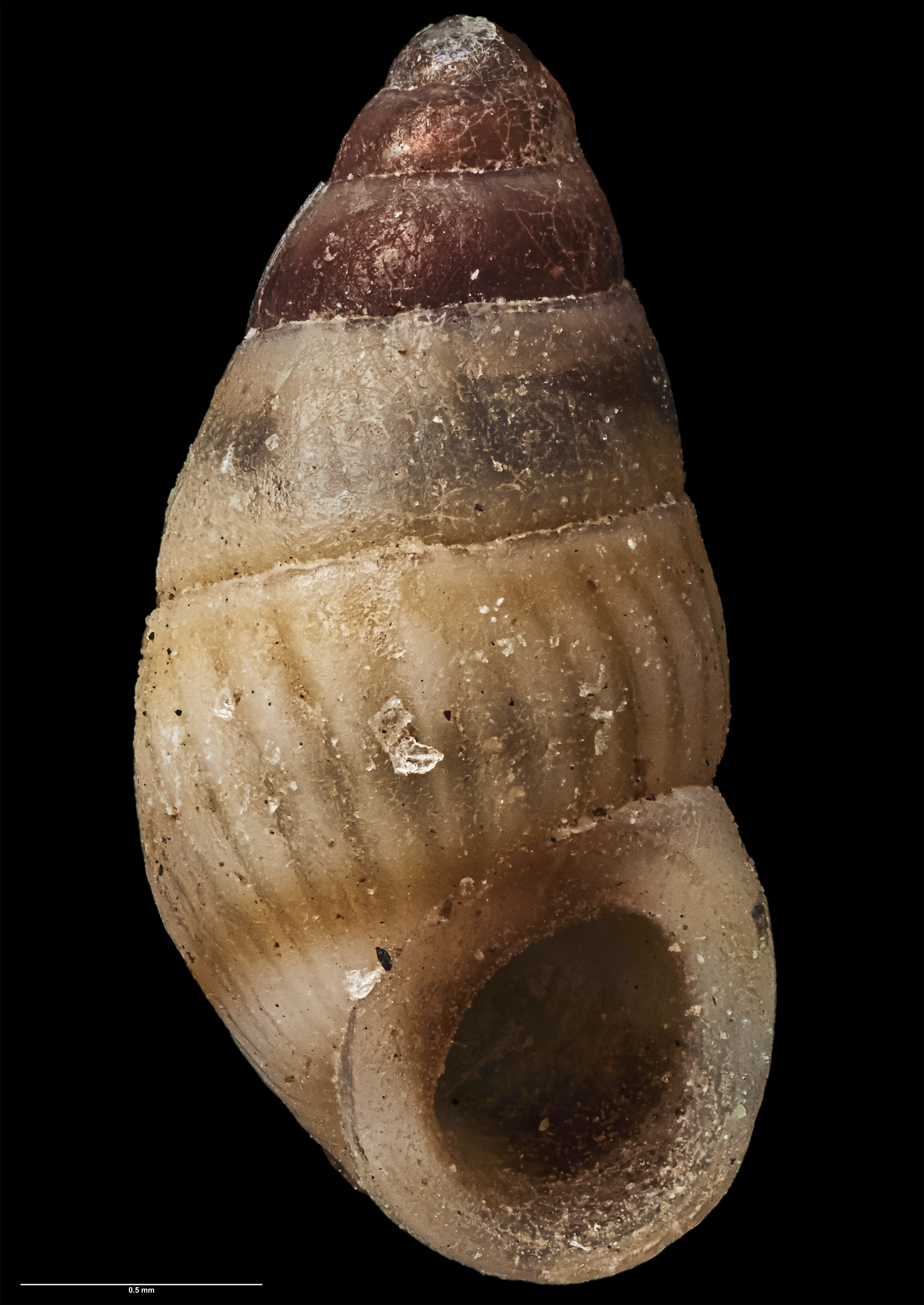
- Holotype of Pisinna hipkinsi from Auckland War Memorial Museum

Scientific classification
- Domain: Eukaryota
- Kingdom: Animalia
- Phylum: Mollusca
- Class: Gastropoda
- Subclass: Caenogastropoda
- Order: Littorinimorpha
- Family: Anabathridae
- Genus: Pisinna
- Species: P. hipkinsi

Binomial name
- Pisinna hipkinsi (Ponder, 1965)

Synonyms
- Estea hipkinsi Ponder, 1965

= Pisinna hipkinsi =

Species of gastropod

Pisinna hipkinsi is a species of marine gastropod mollusc in the family Anabathridae. First described by Winston Ponder in 1965 as Estea hipkinsi, it is endemic to the waters of New Zealand.

== Description ==
Pisinna hipkinsi has an elongated conic shape, twice the height of its aperture, and had five and half whorls. The species measures 2.38mm, by 1.3mm. It is predominantly a pale yellow color, except for its protoconch which is dark red.

The species is similar in appearance to Pisinna impressa, but can be told apart by the absence of a subsutural incised spiral, and larger size in Pisinna hipkinsi.

== Distribution ==
The species is endemic to New Zealand. The holotype was collected by R.S. Bird in June 1951 from Spirits Bay at the far north of the Aupouri Peninsula in Northland. While originally described as being exclusively found in the far north of New Zealand, the species has since been identified as far east as the Aldermen Islands, and Snares Islands / Tini Heke, 200 km south of the South Island.
