= Amphithalamus incidatus =

Scientific classification
- Kingdom: Animalia
- Phylum: Mollusca
- Class: Gastropoda
- Subclass: Caenogastropoda
- Order: Littorinimorpha
- Family: Anabathridae
- Genus: Amphithalamus
- Species: A. incidatus

Binomial name
- Amphithalamus incidatus (Frauenfeld, 1867)

Synonyms
- Amphithalamus (Amphithalamus) incidatus (Frauenfeld, 1867) alternative representation; Notoscrobs (Microfossa) incidata (Frauenfeld, 1867) (incorrect gender ending); Notoscrobs (Microfossa) incidatus (Frauenfeld, 1867) ·; Sabanaea incidata Frauenfeld, 1867

Species of gastropod

Amphithalamus incidatus is a species of minute sea snails, marine gastropod mollusks or micromollusks in the family Anabathridae.

Subspecies

- Amphithalamus incidatus incidatus (Frauenfeld, 1867)
- Amphithalamus incidatus maoria (Ponder, 1968)

== Description ==
The length of the shell attains 1.4 mm, its diameter 0.7 mm.

(Original description in Latin) The shell is conical, robust, brown, smooth, and weakly shiny. It possesses five flat whorls, with edges sharply constricted on both sides, so that the suture lies as if in a deepened groove. The aperture is rounded, angled at the top, and measures less than half the shell's height; its rim is thickened.

== Distribution ==
This species is endemic to Australia and occurs off New South Wales, Queensland, South Australia, Tasmania, Victoria and Western Australia.
