= Amphithalamus immigrus =

Scientific classification
- Kingdom: Animalia
- Phylum: Mollusca
- Class: Gastropoda
- Subclass: Caenogastropoda
- Order: Littorinimorpha
- Family: Anabathridae
- Genus: Amphithalamus
- Species: †A. immigrus

Binomial name
- †Amphithalamus immigrus Lozouet, 1998

Species of gastropod

Amphithalamus immigrus is an extinct species of minute sea snails, marine gastropod mollusks or micromollusks in the family Anabathridae.

== Distribution ==
Fossils of this species were found in Aquitaine, France.
