= Eatonina fuscoelongata =

Scientific classification
- Kingdom: Animalia
- Phylum: Mollusca
- Class: Gastropoda
- Subclass: Caenogastropoda
- Order: Littorinimorpha
- Family: Cingulopsidae
- Genus: Eatonina
- Species: E. fuscoelongata

Binomial name
- Eatonina fuscoelongata Rolán & Hernández, 2006

Species of gastropod

Eatonina fuscoelongata is a species of minute sea snail, a marine gastropod mollusk in the family Cingulopsidae.
