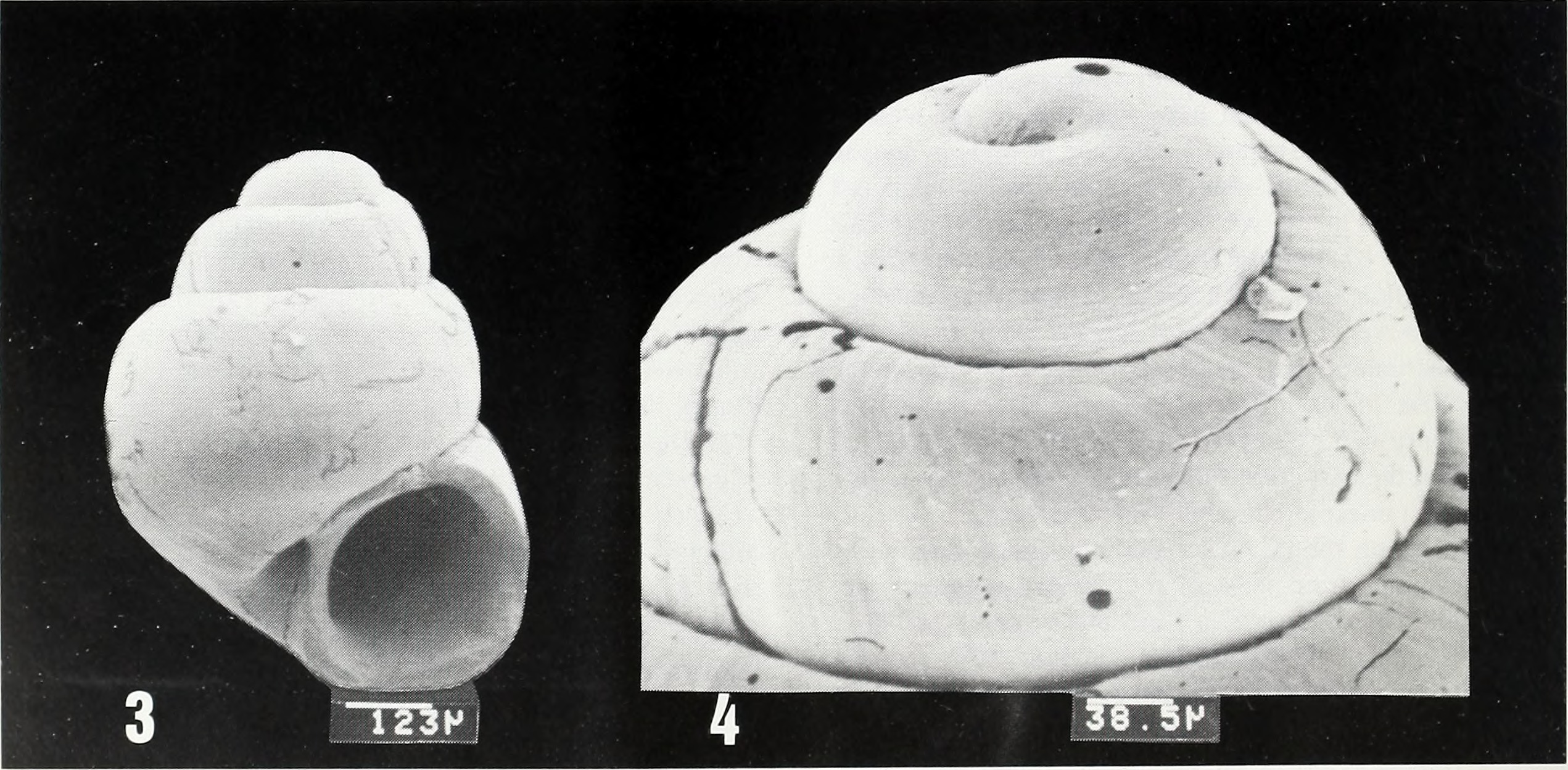
- Eatonina laurensi

Scientific classification
- Kingdom: Animalia
- Phylum: Mollusca
- Class: Gastropoda
- Subclass: Caenogastropoda
- Order: Littorinimorpha
- Family: Cingulopsidae
- Genus: Eatonina
- Species: E. laurensi

Binomial name
- Eatonina laurensi Moolenbeek & Faber, 1991

= Eatonina laurensi =

Species of gastropod

Eatonina laurensi is a species of small sea snail, a marine gastropod mollusk in the family Cingulopsidae.
