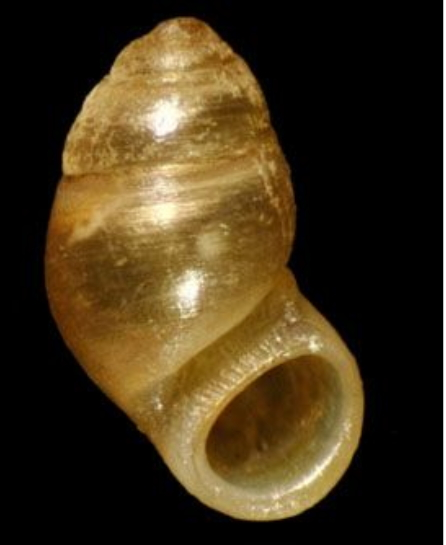
- Shell of Amphithalamus jacksoni

Scientific classification
- Kingdom: Animalia
- Phylum: Mollusca
- Class: Gastropoda
- Subclass: Caenogastropoda
- Order: Littorinimorpha
- Family: Anabathridae
- Genus: Amphithalamus
- Species: A. jacksoni

Binomial name
- Amphithalamus jacksoni (Brazier, 1895)

Synonyms
- Amphithalamus (Amphithalamus) jacksoni (Brazier, 1895) alternative representation; Rissoa (Scrobs) badia R. B. Watson, 1886 junior subjective synonym; Rissoa badia R. B. Watson, 1886 (non Petterd, 1884 (junior primary homonym); Rissoa jacksoni Brazier, 1895 (superseded combination); Rissoia (Amphithalamus) jacksoni Brazier, 1895 (superseded combination)

= Amphithalamus jacksoni =

Species of gastropod

Amphithalamus jacksoni is a species of minute sea snails, marine gastropod mollusks or micromollusks in the family Anabathridae.

== Description ==
The length of the shell attains 1.8 mm.

(Original description as Rissoa (Scrobs) badia) The shell is small, strong, oval, smooth, and lustrous, appearing fulvous chestnut with a broad oblique base, a short spire, few laterally flattened whorls, a blunt rounded tip, and a smallish aperture that is thrust out to the right from the body.

=== Sculpture and coloration ===
There are very many slight lines of growth and fine, rather distant, microscopic spiral furrows, which are least obsolete around the top of the whorls and on the base. The color is a dark translucent dirty chestnut, with a lustrous surface. The spire is short, with conical, barely convex profiles. The apex is blunt and rounded, the extreme tip being barely raised; the first one and a half whorls are very finely and closely stippled in rather distant microscopic spiral lines.

=== Whorls and aperture ===
Comprising four and a half whorls, the first three are broadly conical, with slightly convex outlines; the body whorl is tumid, with a short, conical, hardly rounded base, from which the aperture is projected out to one side. The suture is rather distinctly impressed. The aperture is gibbously semicircular and rather small; it lies rather transversely to the axis of the shell and is separated from the body by a broad shelf, in which a deep furrow is sunk, interrupted at either end. This furrow is crossed to the right by the outer lip running on from the mouth-corner to join the body-whorl, and to the left it is crossed by a narrow rounded swelling from the axis.

=== Lips and umbilicus ===
The outer lip is bluntly rounded on the edge, which projects freely all around the aperture with a slight opercular ledge a little way within; it is not patulous, but on the contrary is rather slightly contracted. The direction of the outer lip, from its insertion, is at first straightforward and outward; it then curves freely all around to its junction with the inner lip. The inner lip is long, very oblique, almost straight, having only a little bend at either end; it is blunt, but hardly thick. Behind it, and separating it from the body, is a strange, deep, wide, very oblique furrow, from the middle of which opens an almost hidden poriform umbilicus.

== Distribution ==
This species is endemic to Australia and occurs off Queensland and New South Wales.
