= Amphithalamus latisulcus =

Scientific classification
- Kingdom: Animalia
- Phylum: Mollusca
- Class: Gastropoda
- Subclass: Caenogastropoda
- Order: Littorinimorpha
- Family: Anabathridae
- Genus: Amphithalamus
- Species: A. latisulcus

Binomial name
- Amphithalamus latisulcus (Ponder, 1968)

Synonyms
- Notoscrobs (Microfossa) latisulcus Ponder, 1968 (superseded combination)

Species of gastropod

Amphithalamus latisulcus is a species of minute sea snails, marine gastropod molluscs or micromolluscs in the family Anabathridae.

== Description ==
The length of the shell attains 1.34 mm, its diameter 0.76 mm.

== Distribution ==
This species is endemic to New Zealand and occurs off the North Island, and South Island as far south as Dunedin.
