= Amphithalamus maoria =

Scientific classification
- Kingdom: Animalia
- Phylum: Mollusca
- Class: Gastropoda
- Subclass: Caenogastropoda
- Order: Littorinimorpha
- Family: Anabathridae
- Genus: Amphithalamus
- Species: A. maoria

Binomial name
- Amphithalamus maoria (Ponder, 1968)

Synonyms
- Notoscrobs (Microfossa) incidata maoria Ponder, 1968 (superseded combination)

Species of gastropod

Amphithalamus maoria is a species of minute sea snails, marine gastropod molluscs or micromolluscs in the family Anabathridae.

== Description ==
The length of the shell attains 1.56 mm, its diameter is 0.91 mm.

== Distribution ==
This species is endemic to New Zealand and occurs off North Island.
