= Eatonina caribaea =

Scientific classification
- Kingdom: Animalia
- Phylum: Mollusca
- Class: Gastropoda
- Subclass: Caenogastropoda
- Order: Littorinimorpha
- Family: Cingulopsidae
- Genus: Eatonina
- Species: E. caribaea

Binomial name
- Eatonina caribaea (Faber, 2005)

Synonyms
- Coriandria caribaea Faber, 2005 (original combination)

Species of gastropod

Eatonina caribaea is a species of small sea snail, a marine gastropod mollusk in the family Cingulopsidae.
