= Skenella wareni =

Scientific classification
- Kingdom: Animalia
- Phylum: Mollusca
- Class: Gastropoda
- Subclass: Caenogastropoda
- Order: Littorinimorpha
- Family: Cingulopsidae
- Genus: Skenella
- Species: S. wareni

Binomial name
- Skenella wareni Ponder & Worsfold, 1994

Species of gastropod

Skenella wareni is a species of small sea snail, a marine gastropod mollusk in the family Cingulopsidae.

== Description ==
The maximum recorded shell length is 1.64 mm.

== Habitat ==
Minimum recorded depth is 15 m. Maximum recorded depth is 24 m.
