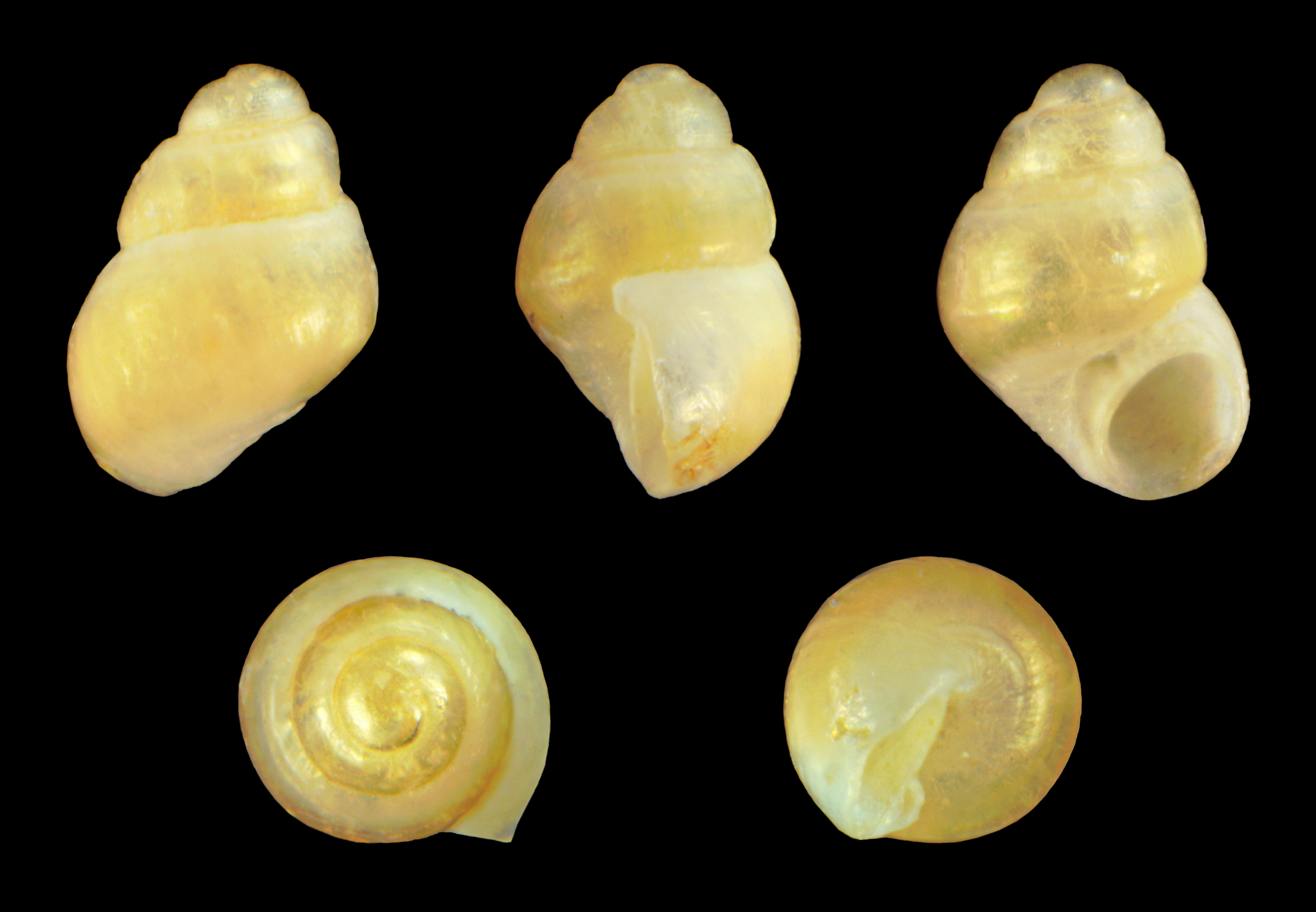
- Shell of Amphithalamus vallei

Scientific classification
- Kingdom: Animalia
- Phylum: Mollusca
- Class: Gastropoda
- Subclass: Caenogastropoda
- Order: Littorinimorpha
- Family: Anabathridae
- Genus: Amphithalamus
- Species: A. vallei

Binomial name
- Amphithalamus vallei Aguayo & Jaume, 1947

Synonyms
- Amphithalamus (Amphithalamus) vallei Aguayo & Jaume, 1947 alternative representation

= Amphithalamus vallei =

Species of gastropod

Amphithalamus vallei is a species of minute sea snails, marine gastropod mollusks or micromollusks in the family Anabathridae.

== Description ==
The length of the shell varies between 1.07 mm and 1.25 mm, its diameter between 0.67 mm and 0.87 mm.

== Distribution ==
This species occurs in the Caribbean Sea off Cuba, Bonaire, Sint Eustatius and Saba and Puerto Rico.
