= Amphithalamus waitemata =

Scientific classification
- Kingdom: Animalia
- Phylum: Mollusca
- Class: Gastropoda
- Subclass: Caenogastropoda
- Order: Littorinimorpha
- Family: Anabathridae
- Genus: Amphithalamus
- Species: †A. waitemata

Binomial name
- †Amphithalamus waitemata (Laws, 1950)

Synonyms
- † Amphithalamus (Notoscrobs) waitemata (Laws, 1950) alternative representation; † Notoscrobs waitemata Laws, 1950 (superseded combination)

Species of gastropod

Amphithalamus waitemata is an extinct species of minute sea snails, marine gastropod mollusks or micromollusks in the family Anabathridae.

== Distribution ==
Fossils of this species were found in Lower Pliocene strata in Otahuhu, Auckland, New Zealand.
