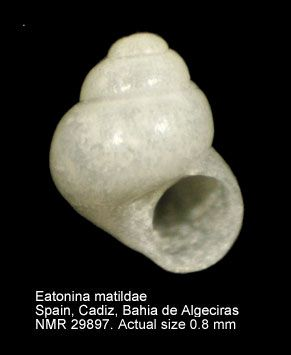
- Eatonina matildae

Scientific classification
- Kingdom: Animalia
- Phylum: Mollusca
- Class: Gastropoda
- Subclass: Caenogastropoda
- Order: Littorinimorpha
- Family: Cingulopsidae
- Genus: Eatonina
- Species: E. matildae

Binomial name
- Eatonina matildae Rubio & Rodriguez Babio, 1996

= Eatonina matildae =

Species of gastropod

Eatonina matildae is a species of minute sea snail, a marine gastropod mollusk in the family Cingulopsidae.
