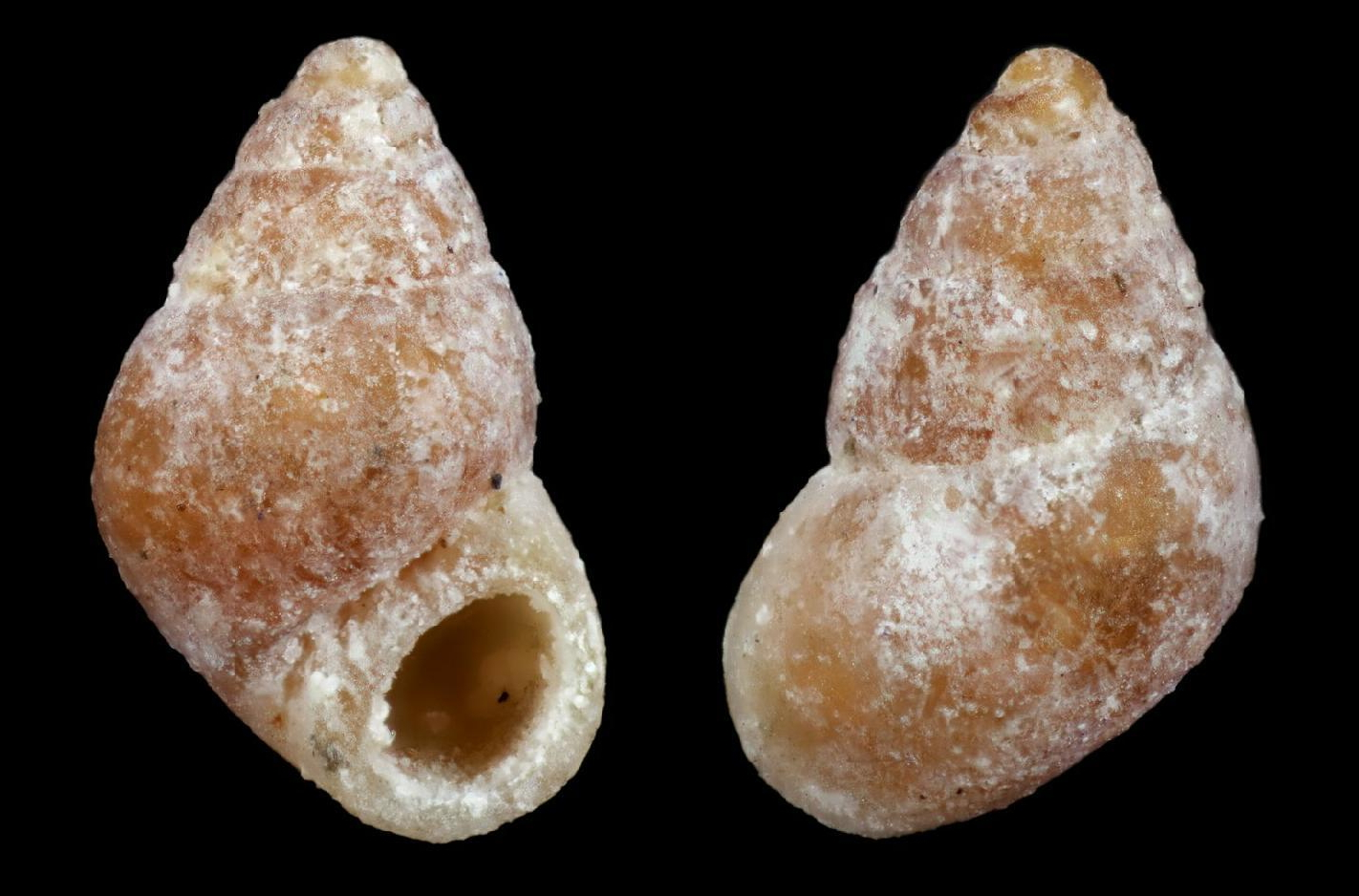
- Shell of Amphithalamus obesus (holotype at the Natural History Museum, London)

Scientific classification
- Kingdom: Animalia
- Phylum: Mollusca
- Class: Gastropoda
- Subclass: Caenogastropoda
- Order: Littorinimorpha
- Family: Anabathridae
- Genus: Amphithalamus
- Species: A. obesus

Binomial name
- Amphithalamus obesus H. Adams, 1866

Synonyms
- Amphithalamus (Amphithalamus) obesus H. Adams, 1866 alternative representation; Estea erma Cotton, 1944 ·

= Amphithalamus obesus =

Species of gastropod

Amphithalamus obesus is a species of minute sea snails, marine gastropod mollusks or micromollusks in the family Anabathridae.

== Description ==
The length of the shell attains 1.5 mm, its diameter 0.75 mm.

(Original description in Latin) The shell is obese, densely reddish-horny, shiny, smooth, and somewhat diaphanous, with the margins of the spire excurved. The nuclear apex is normal, not sculptured, and mammillated at the tip. Comprising five whorls, they are somewhat flattened and increase rapidly. The base is swollen and not sculptured. The aperture is suboval, and the outer lip is acute. The labium (in adult shells) is separated from the parietal wall, forming a very deep chamber, appearing straight at the margin, and curved anteriorly at the junction of the lip.

== Distribution ==
This species is endemic to Australia and occurs off South Australia
