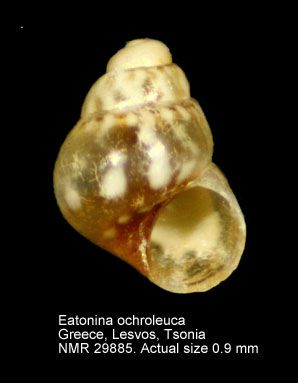
- Natural History Museum Rotterdam

Scientific classification
- Kingdom: Animalia
- Phylum: Mollusca
- Class: Gastropoda
- Subclass: Caenogastropoda
- Order: Littorinimorpha
- Family: Cingulopsidae
- Genus: Eatonina
- Species: E. ochroleuca

Binomial name
- Eatonina ochroleuca (Brusina, 1869)

= Eatonina ochroleuca =

Species of gastropod

Eatonina ochroleuca is a species of small sea snail, a marine gastropod mollusk in the family Cingulopsidae.
