= Amphithalamus fulcira =

Scientific classification
- Kingdom: Animalia
- Phylum: Mollusca
- Class: Gastropoda
- Subclass: Caenogastropoda
- Order: Littorinimorpha
- Family: Anabathridae
- Genus: Amphithalamus
- Species: A. fulcira

Binomial name
- Amphithalamus fulcira (Laseron, 1956)

Synonyms
- Amphithalamus (Amphithalamus) fulcira (Laseron, 1956) alternative representation; Scrobs fulcira Laseron, 1956 (original combination)

Species of gastropod

Amphithalamus fulcira is a species of minute sea snails, marine gastropod mollusks or micromollusks in the family Anabathridae.

== Description ==
The length of the shell attains 1.56 mm, its diameter is 0.91 mm.

== Distribution ==
This species is endemic to Australia and occurs off Queensland.
