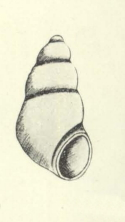
- Shell of Amphithalamus sundayensis

Scientific classification
- Kingdom: Animalia
- Phylum: Mollusca
- Class: Gastropoda
- Subclass: Caenogastropoda
- Order: Littorinimorpha
- Family: Anabathridae
- Genus: Amphithalamus
- Species: A. sundayensis

Binomial name
- Amphithalamus sundayensis W. R. B. Oliver, 1915

Synonyms
- Amphithalamus (Notoscrobs) sundayensis (W. R. B. Oliver, 1915) alternative representation

= Amphithalamus sundayensis =

Species of gastropod

Amphithalamus sundayensis is a species of minute sea snails, marine gastropod molluscs or micromolluscs in the family Anabathridae.

== Description ==
The length of the shell attains 1.2 mm, its diameter 0.6 mm.

(Original description) The shell is minute and ovate, with a blunt apex. It features four flattened whorls and an impressed suture. The aperture is detached, broadly elliptical, and slightly angled behind. The peristome is thickened, and a ridge connects its posterior end with the body whorl. The umbilical furrow is wide.

The whole shell appears quite smooth. Its colour is light olive-brown, with the suture, peristome, and lower part of the body whorl being darker.

== Distribution ==
This species is endemic to New Zealand and occurs off the Kermadec Islands.
