= Eatonina martae =

Scientific classification
- Kingdom: Animalia
- Phylum: Mollusca
- Class: Gastropoda
- Subclass: Caenogastropoda
- Order: Littorinimorpha
- Family: Cingulopsidae
- Genus: Eatonina
- Species: E. martae

Binomial name
- Eatonina martae Rolán & Templado, 1993

Species of gastropod

Eatonina martae is a species of small sea snail, a marine gastropod mollusk in the family Cingulopsidae.
