= Amphithalamus liratus =

Scientific classification
- Kingdom: Animalia
- Phylum: Mollusca
- Class: Gastropoda
- Subclass: Caenogastropoda
- Order: Littorinimorpha
- Family: Anabathridae
- Genus: Amphithalamus
- Species: A. liratus

Binomial name
- Amphithalamus liratus Thiele, 1930

Synonyms
- Amphithalamus (Notoscrobs) liratus Thiele, 1930 alternative representation

Species of gastropod

Amphithalamus liratus is a species of minute sea snails, marine gastropod mollusks or micromollusks in the family Anabathridae.

== Distribution ==
This species is endemic to Australia and occurs off Western Australia
