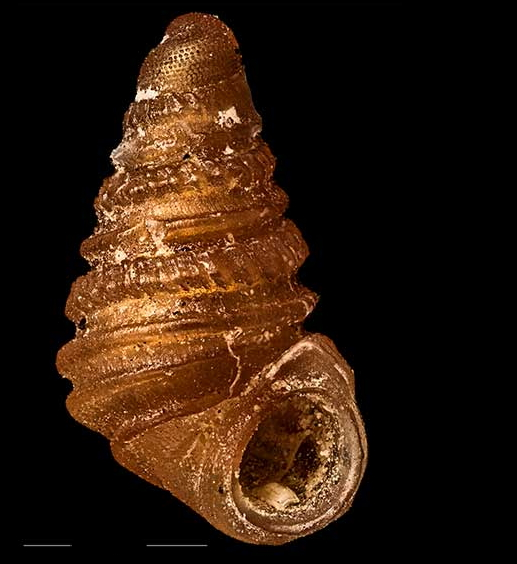
- Shell of Amphithalamus ornatus (holotype at the Auckland Museum)

Scientific classification
- Kingdom: Animalia
- Phylum: Mollusca
- Class: Gastropoda
- Subclass: Caenogastropoda
- Order: Littorinimorpha
- Family: Anabathridae
- Genus: Amphithalamus
- Species: A. ornatus

Binomial name
- Amphithalamus ornatus (A. W. B. Powell, 1927)

Synonyms
- Amphithalamus (Notoscrobs) ornatus (A. W. B. Powell, 1927) alternative representation; Notoscrobs ornatus A. W. B. Powell, 1927 (superseded combination)

= Amphithalamus ornatus =

Species of gastropod

Amphithalamus ornatus is a species of minute sea snails, marine gastropod molluscs or micromolluscs in the family Anabathridae.

== Description ==
The length of the shell attains 1.3 mm, its diameter 0.8 mm.

(Original description) The shell is minute, solid, conical, and imperforate. The protoconch is dome-shaped, consisting of 1 1/2 whorls, and is sculptured with about twelve spiral rows of minute, round, shallow pits spaced alternately with those of the rows immediately above and below, thus giving a honeycomb effect.

The shell consists of 4 1<2 whorls. The spire is conic with straight outlines. The spire-whorls are sculptured with two spiral keels, the upper one being crossed by slightly oblique strong axial ribs. The body whorl features an additional three plain spiral keels on its base.

The aperture is oblique and oval, slightly constricted above. The peristome is duplicated and continuous, with a smooth, raised inner margin surrounded by an expanded, slightly concave area, which is widest above and on the parietal wall, with its outer edge bounded.

== Distribution ==
This species is endemic to New Zealand and occurs off the north-eastern North Island as far south as Mayor Island.
