= Skenella paludinoides =

Scientific classification
- Kingdom: Animalia
- Phylum: Mollusca
- Class: Gastropoda
- Subclass: Caenogastropoda
- Order: Littorinimorpha
- Family: Cingulopsidae
- Genus: Skenella
- Species: S. paludinoides

Binomial name
- Skenella paludinoides (Smith, 1902)

Synonyms
- Eatoniella paludinoides E.A. Smith, 1902 (basionym); Skenella (Skenella) paludinoides (E.A. Smith, 1902)

Species of gastropod

Skenella paludinoides is a species of small sea snail, a marine gastropod mollusk in the family Cingulopsidae.
