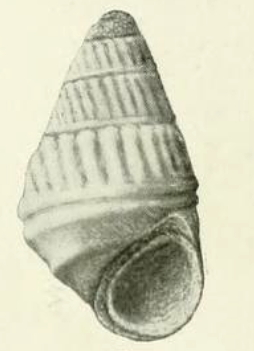
- Shell of Amphithalamus erosus (holotype)

Scientific classification
- Kingdom: Animalia
- Phylum: Mollusca
- Class: Gastropoda
- Subclass: Caenogastropoda
- Order: Littorinimorpha
- Family: Anabathridae
- Genus: Amphithalamus
- Species: A. erosus

Binomial name
- Amphithalamus erosus (Odhner, 1924)

Synonyms
- Amphithalamus (Notoscrobs) erosus (Odhner, 1924) · alternative representation; Rissoa erosa Odhner, 1924 (superseded combination)

= Amphithalamus erosus =

Species of gastropod

Amphithalamus erosus is a species of minute sea snails, marine gastropod mollusks or micromollusks in the family Anabathridae.

== Description ==
The length of the shell attains 1.5 mm, its diameter 0.8 mm.

(Original description) The shell is minute, conical, solid, and imperforate. It features five flattened whorls and a canaliculate suture. The spire measures about 1.5 times the aperture in height. The protoconch consists of 1.5 whorls, appearing reddish-brown and sculptured with minute grains in many very close spiral lines. Subsequent whorls are light yellowish-brown with longitudinal costae separated by narrower furrows. Above the suture, a strong revolving thread is present. On the body whorl, the upper half carries about 22 longitudinal costae. The periphery is encircled by a pair of strong spiral cords, and the base is flattened, bearing an additional cord. Except for the strong costae and ribs, only fine lines of growth are visible. The aperture is oblique and rounded-ovate; the peristome is thick, continuous, and double, with an interior swelling rising from above and below and extending beyond the primary lip externally. The columella is oblique and sinuous; the columellar lip is sunk and brownish.

== Distribution ==
This species occurs off New Zealand.
