= Eatonina kitanagato =

Scientific classification
- Kingdom: Animalia
- Phylum: Mollusca
- Class: Gastropoda
- Subclass: Caenogastropoda
- Order: Littorinimorpha
- Family: Cingulopsidae
- Genus: Eatonina
- Species: E. kitanagato

Binomial name
- Eatonina kitanagato Fukuda, Nakamura & Yamashita, 1998

Species of gastropod

Eatonina kitanagato is a species of small sea snail, a marine gastropod mollusk in the family Cingulopsidae.
