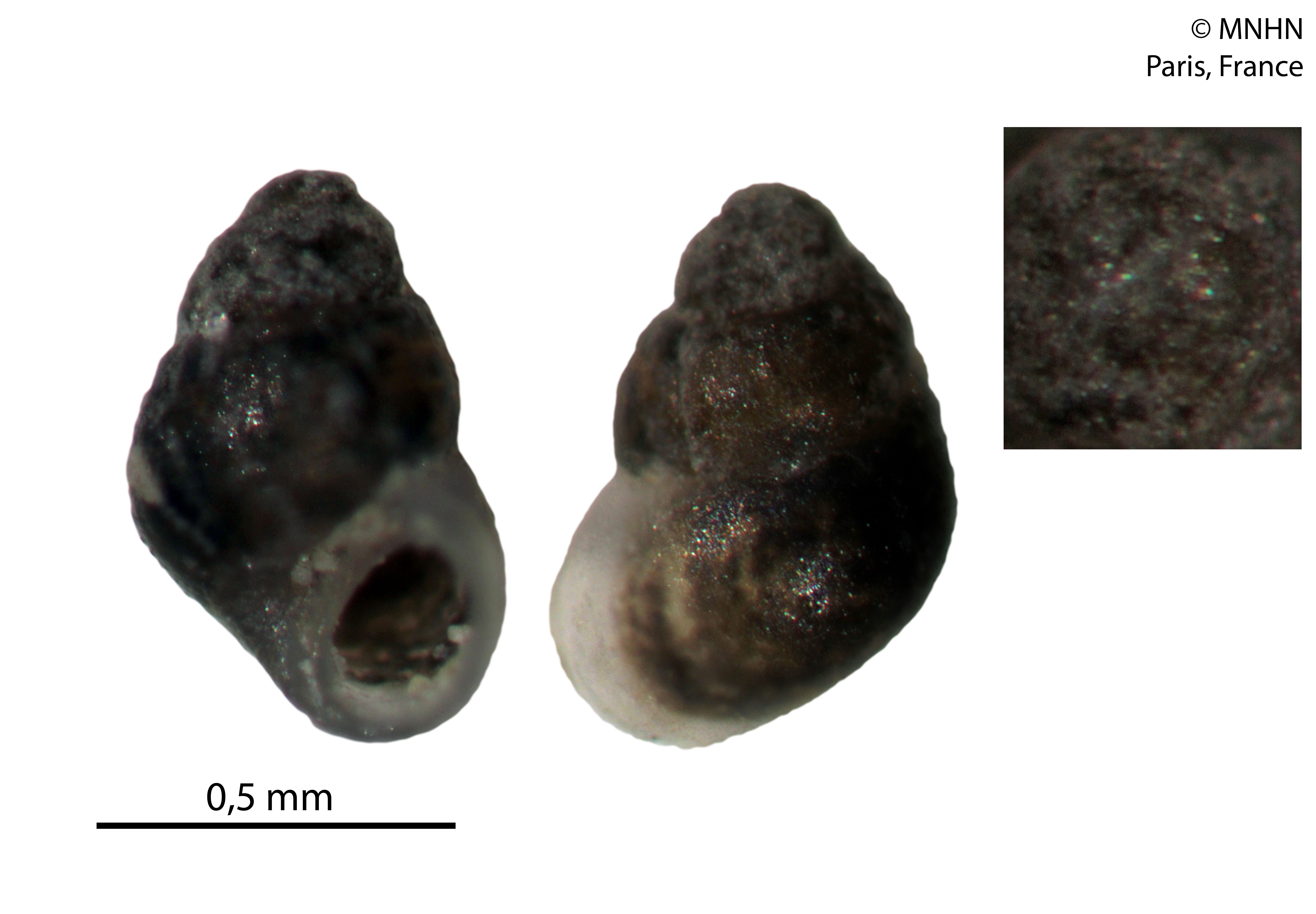
- Shell of Amphithalamus niger (paratype at MNHN, Paris)

Scientific classification
- Kingdom: Animalia
- Phylum: Mollusca
- Class: Gastropoda
- Subclass: Caenogastropoda
- Order: Littorinimorpha
- Family: Anabathridae
- Genus: Amphithalamus
- Species: A. niger

Binomial name
- Amphithalamus niger Rolán, 1992

= Amphithalamus niger =

Species of gastropod

Amphithalamus niger is a species of minute sea snails, marine gastropod mollusks or micromollusks in the family Anabathridae.

== Description ==
The length of the shell attains 1.05 mm.

== Distribution ==
This species occurs off Cuba.
