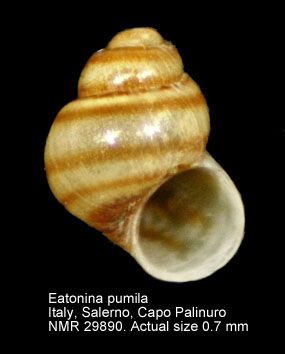
- Eatonina pumila shell

Scientific classification
- Kingdom: Animalia
- Phylum: Mollusca
- Class: Gastropoda
- Subclass: Caenogastropoda
- Order: Littorinimorpha
- Family: Cingulopsidae
- Genus: Eatonina
- Species: E. pumila

Binomial name
- Eatonina pumila (Monterosato, 1884)

= Eatonina pumila =

Species of gastropod

Eatonina pumila is a species of small sea snail, a marine gastropod mollusk in the family Cingulopsidae.
