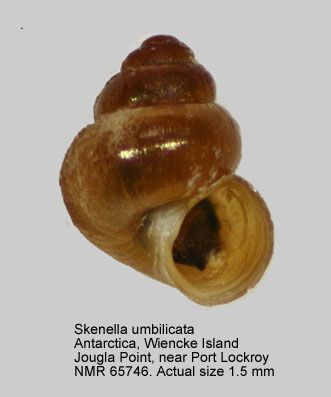

Scientific classification
- Kingdom: Animalia
- Phylum: Mollusca
- Class: Gastropoda
- Subclass: Caenogastropoda
- Order: Littorinimorpha
- Family: Cingulopsidae
- Genus: Skenella
- Species: S. umbilicata

Binomial name
- Skenella umbilicata Ponder, 1983

Synonyms
- Skenella (Skenella) umbilicata Ponder, 1983

= Skenella umbilicata =

Species of gastropod

Skenella umbilicata is a species of small sea snail, a marine gastropod mollusk in the family Cingulopsidae.

== Description ==
The maximum recorded shell length is 1.66 mm.

== Habitat ==
Minimum recorded depth is 4 m. Maximum recorded depth is 10 m.
