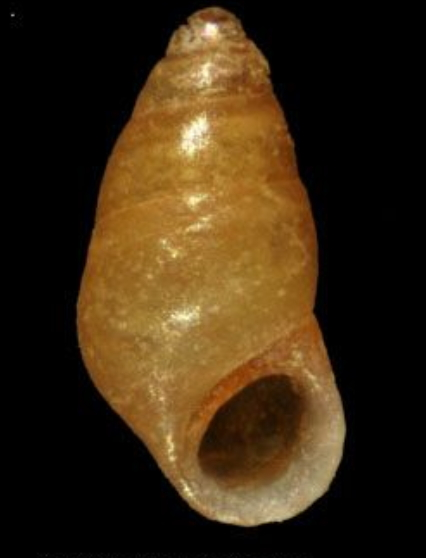
- Shell of Amphithalamus falsestea

Scientific classification
- Kingdom: Animalia
- Phylum: Mollusca
- Class: Gastropoda
- Subclass: Caenogastropoda
- Order: Littorinimorpha
- Family: Anabathridae
- Genus: Amphithalamus
- Species: A. falsestea

Binomial name
- Amphithalamus falsestea (Ponder, 1968)

Synonyms
- Notoscrobs (Microfossa) falsestea Ponder, 1968 (superseded combination)

= Amphithalamus falsestea =

Species of gastropod

Amphithalamus falsestea is a species of minute sea snails, marine gastropod molluscs or micromolluscs in the family Anabathridae.

== Description ==
The length of the shell attains 2.15 mm, its diameter is 1.06 mm.

== Distribution ==
This species is endemic to New Zealand and occurs off the Three Kings Islands, North Island, and north-eastern South Island.
