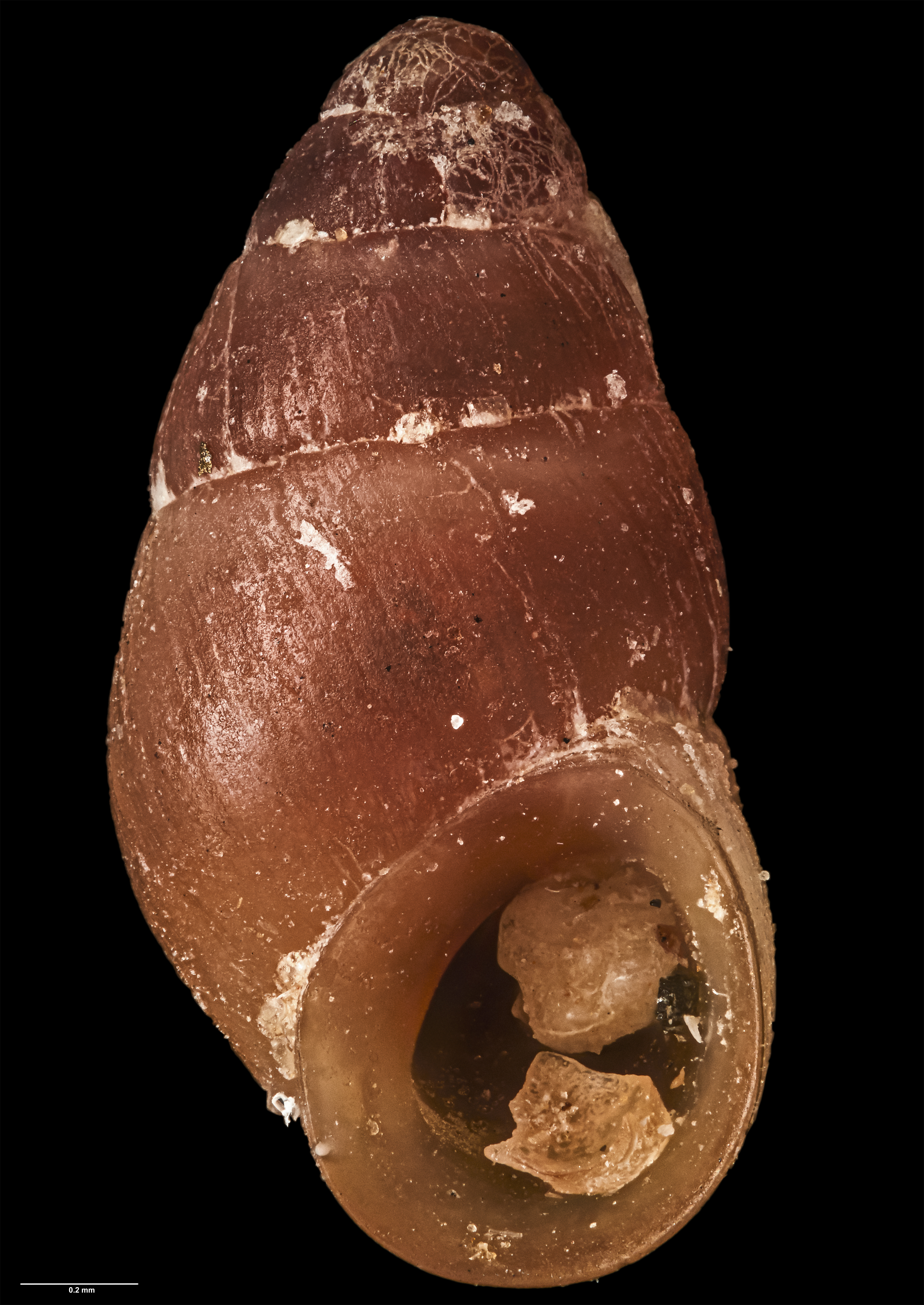
- Holotype of Pisinna rekohuana rekohuana from Auckland War Memorial Museum

Scientific classification
- Kingdom: Animalia
- Phylum: Mollusca
- Class: Gastropoda
- Subclass: Caenogastropoda
- Order: Littorinimorpha
- Family: Anabathridae
- Genus: Pisinna
- Species: P. rekohuana

Binomial name
- Pisinna rekohuana (Powell, 1933)

Synonyms
- Estea rekohuana Powell, 1933

= Pisinna rekohuana =

Species of gastropod

Pisinna rekohuana is a species of marine gastropod mollusc in the family Anabathridae. First described by Badwn Powell in 1933 as Estea rekohuana, it is endemic to the waters of New Zealand. There are two subspecies of the gastropod: Pisinna rekohuana rekohuana, primarily found in the south and Pisinna rekohuana lactorubra, primarily found on the north-east coast of the North Island.

== Description ==
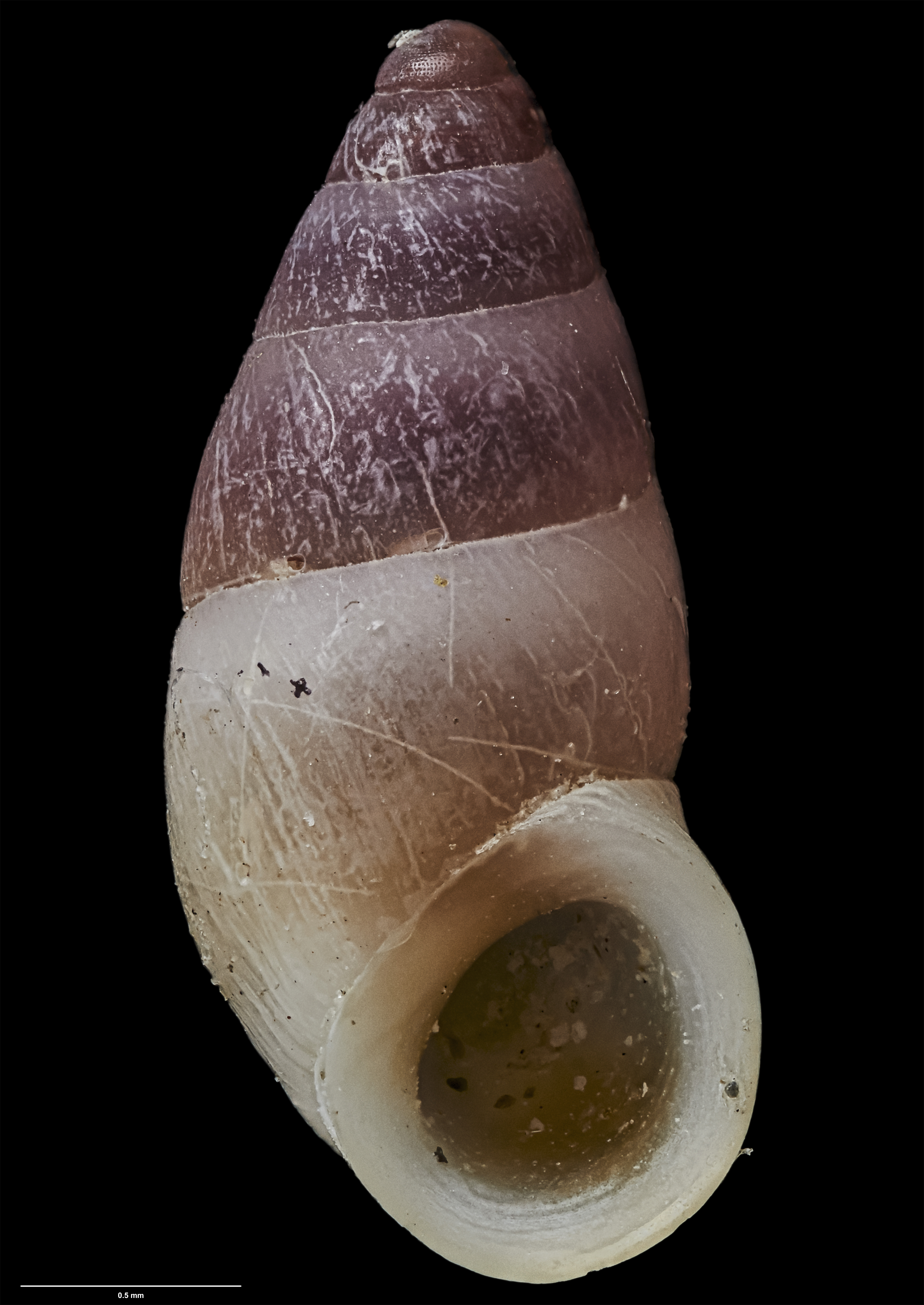
Holotype of the subspecies Pisinna rekohuana lactorubra

Powell described the species as follows:

Shell small, ovate, solid. Whorls 4¾, including low dome-shaped protoconch of 1¾ whorls, which is faintly sculptured with closely spaced spiral striae. The surface of the post-nuclear whorls is smooth, but not polished, and apart from faint, slightly oblique axial growth lines, there is no true sculpture. Spire elevated, bluntly conical, one and a-half times height of aperture. Colour reddish-brown, except for a narrow whitish band immediately below the suture, and the peristome and interior of the aperture, which is more yellowish than reddish-brown. Aperture very large, almost circular. Peristome continuous, much thickened within and clearly marked off from the base by a heavy callus. There is no umbilical chink.

Pisinna rekohuana is similar in appearance to Pisinna minor and Pisinna subfusca, and can be identified by its size (intermediate between the two) and relatively larger aperture.

A subspecies, Pisinna rekohuana lactorubra, was described in 1965 by Winston Ponder, differentiated by its proportionately longer spire and different colour pattern. While Ponder noted a similarity of Pisinna rekohuana lactorubra to Pisinna zosterophila, he believed it was best to classify it as a subspecies of Pisinna rekohuana, due to its distribution and the relationships of forms between the three groups.

The species measures 2.0mm, by 0.9mm, while the subspecies Pisinna rekohuana lactorubra measures 3.2mm by 1.5mm.

== Distribution ==
The species is endemic to New Zealand. The holotype was collected by Powell himself in February 1933 at Waitangi, Chatham Islands. It is found around the South Island, in the waters of the Chatham Islands, commonly at Stewart Island, the Auckland Islands and the Kermadec Islands.

Pisinna rekohuana lactorubra is primarily found to the north-east of North Island under stones in the littoral zone, preferring open coasts. It has been identified on Manawatāwhi / Three Kings Islands, the Manukau Harbour on the west coast of the North Island, and the Mahia Peninsula.

Since the subspecies was first described, Pisinna rekohuana rekohuana has been identified as living in the range previously thought to be that of Pisinna rekohuana lactorubra, such as the north-east coast of the North Island, and the Mahia Peninsula.
