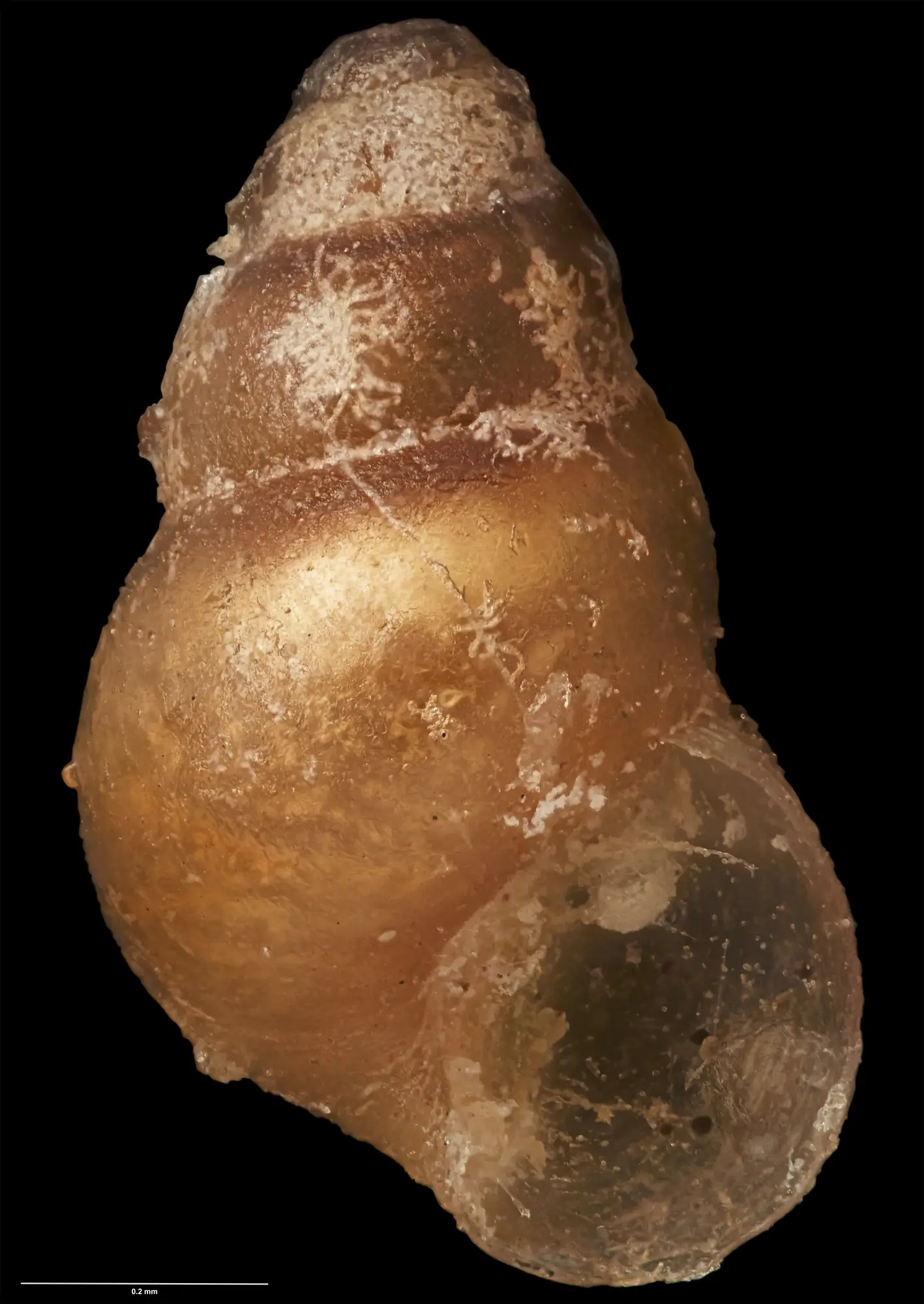
- Holotype

Scientific classification
- Kingdom: Animalia
- Phylum: Mollusca
- Class: Gastropoda
- Subclass: Caenogastropoda
- Order: Littorinimorpha
- Superfamily: Cingulopsoidea
- Family: Cingulopsidae
- Genus: Tubbreva
- Species: T. exigua

Binomial name
- Tubbreva exigua (Ponder, 1965)

Synonyms
- Rufodardanula exigua Ponder, 1965; Rufodardanula (Tubbreva) exigua Ponder, 1965

= Tubbreva exigua =

Genus of gastropods

Tubbreva exigua is a species of minute sea snails, marine gastropod molluscs belonging to the family Cingulopsidae. First described by Winston Ponder in 1965, the species is endemic to New Zealand, primarily found in mid and lower tidal margins of the country.

== Description ==
In the original description, Ponder described the genus as below:

Shell minute, thin, fragile, smooth, red-brown, elongate-conic, imperforate. Whorls 4¼, weakly convex, protoconch dark red-brown, smooth, small, not distinctly marked off. Sutures false-margined by a dark, red-brown, narrow band; body whorl not swollen, periphery and base rounded. Aperture rather large, angled above and below, peristome thin, continuous, a thin glaze across parietal wall. Columella vertical, with a faint swelling above. In holotype and majority of specimens encountered outer lip thin, fragile, very slightly excavated, though occasional shells show some thickening of entire peristome. Colour reddish-brown on spire, a pale brown, indistinct band in middle of body whorl, periphery and base reddish-brown, darker below sutures and in umbilical area. Variation in size, shape, and convexity of whorls considerable. Though superficially similar to the deepwater R. minitula, that species differs in having a blunter protoconch, nearly flat whorls, and a rounded aperture. R. exaltata differs in its larger size, broader spire and heavier shell.

The species' shell is similar in appearance to Skenella spadix, but has a taller spire, whorls that are less convex. The holotype of the species measures 0.1 mm (0.0039 in) in height, with a width of 0.575 mm (0.0226 in).

== Taxonomy ==
The species was first described by Winston Ponder in 1965 as Rufodardanula (Tubbreva) exigua, the type species of the subgenus Rufodardanula (Tubbreva). The holotype was collected by W.R.B. Oliver on 4 September 1910 from brown weeds in rock pools east of Purau, Lyttelton Harbour, and is held by the Auckland War Memorial Museum. In 1980, Tubbreva was raised to genus level by Ponder and E. K. Yoo, making the species the type species for the genus, and leading to the currently accepted name Tubbreva exigua.

== Distribution and habitat ==
T. exigua is endemic to New Zealand, found in the waters surrounding the mainland, as Manawatāwhi / Three Kings Islands, the Chatham Islands and the New Zealand Subantarctic Islands. The species more commonly lives at mid- and lower tidal levels.
