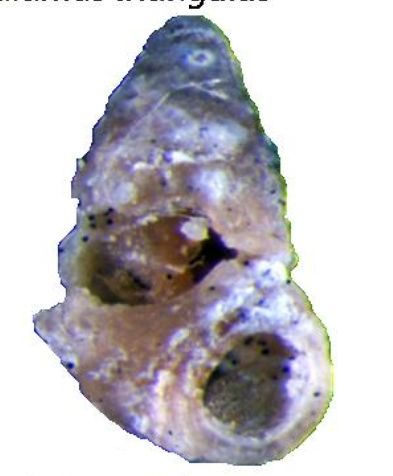
- Shell of Amphithalamus triangulus (specimen at the Tasmanian Museum and Art Gallery)

Scientific classification
- Kingdom: Animalia
- Phylum: Mollusca
- Class: Gastropoda
- Subclass: Caenogastropoda
- Order: Littorinimorpha
- Family: Anabathridae
- Genus: Amphithalamus
- Species: A. triangulus

Binomial name
- Amphithalamus triangulus May, 1915

Synonyms
- Amphithalamus (Notoscrobs) triangulus May, 1915 alternative representation

= Amphithalamus triangulus =

Species of gastropod

Amphithalamus triangulus is a species of minute sea snails, marine gastropod mollusks or micromollusks in the family Anabathridae.

== Description ==
The length of the shell attains 1.5 mm, its diameter 1 mm.

(Original description) The shell is small, brown, shining, and pyramidal. It has four whorls, including a smooth, dome-shaped protoconch. The three adult whorls are encircled by two rounded keels, one at the suture and the other at the periphery. The upper keel is at first smooth, but develops nodules, which give it a beaded appearance on the body whorl. The lower keel is itself divided by a narrow groove. On the base are three small keels. The aperture is roundly-ovate, and the peristome is continuous, pointed above, forming a flattened ring, while the opening itself is margined by a narrow, raised thread.

== Distribution ==
This species is endemic to Australia and occurs off Tasmania.
