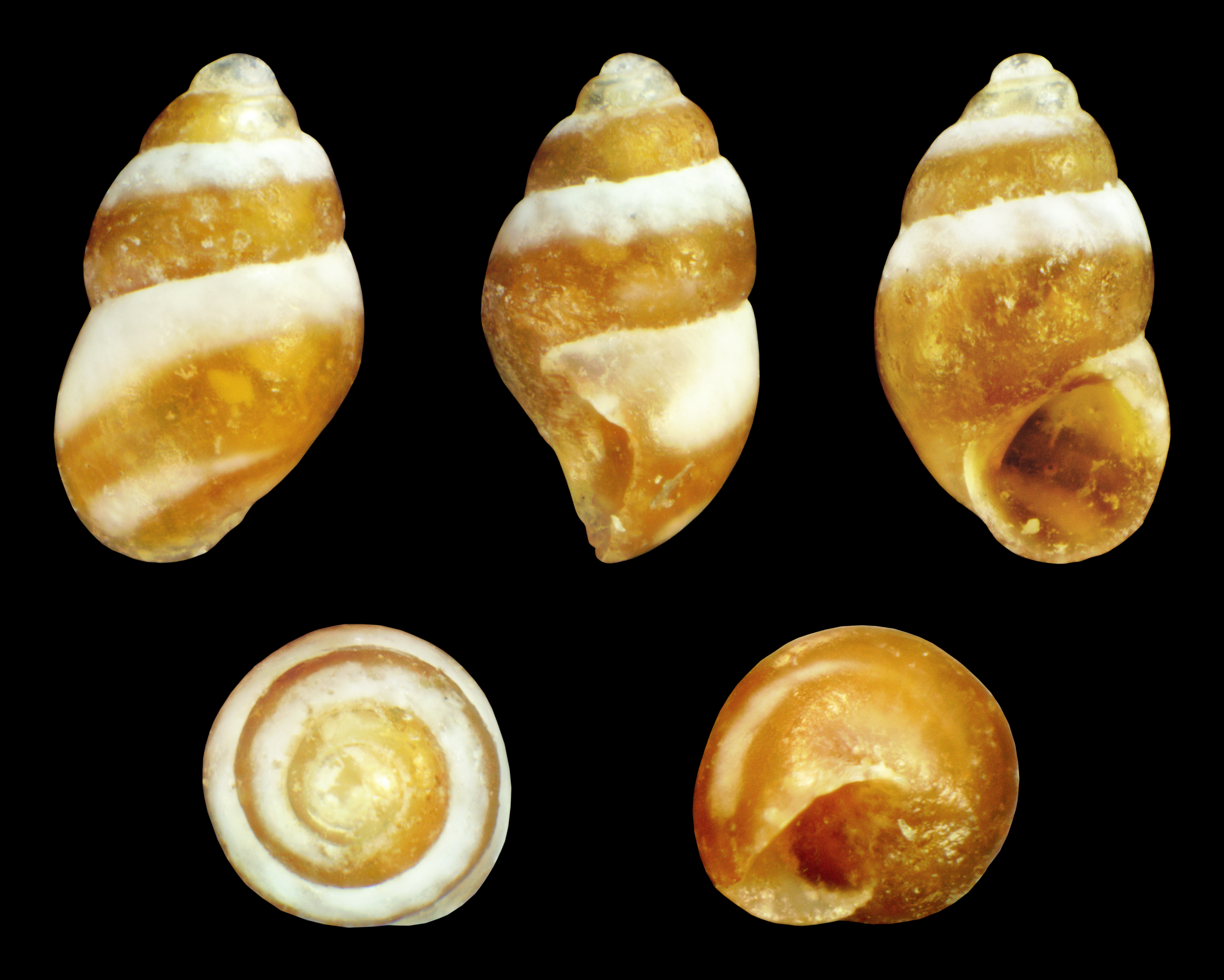
- Pisinna chasteri

Scientific classification
- Kingdom: Animalia
- Phylum: Mollusca
- Class: Gastropoda
- Subclass: Caenogastropoda
- Order: Littorinimorpha
- Family: Anabathridae
- Genus: Pisinna; Monterosato, 1878

= Pisinna =

Genus of gastropods

Pisinna is a genus of gastropods belonging to the family Anabathridae.

The genus has almost cosmopolitan distribution.

Species:

- Pisinna albizona (Laseron, 1950)
- Pisinna angulata Ponder & Yoo, 1976
- Pisinna angustata (Powell, 1927)
- Pisinna approxima (Petterd, 1884)
- Pisinna asymmetrica (Laws, 1941)
- Pisinna bicincta Santos & Absalão, 2004
- Pisinna bicolor (Petterd, 1884)
- Pisinna boucheti Palazzi, 1983
- Pisinna brunescens (W.H.Turton, 1932)
- Pisinna cadus (Laws, 1950)
- Pisinna castella (Laseron, 1950)
- Pisinna cazini (Vélain, 1877)
- Pisinna chasteri (Melvill & Standen, 1895)
- Pisinna circumlabra Ponder & Yoo, 1976
- Pisinna colmani Ponder & Yoo, 1976
- Pisinna columnaria (Hedley & May, 1908)
- Pisinna compressa (Laseron, 1956)
- Pisinna costata (Hedley, 1911)
- Pisinna crawfordi (E.A.Smith, 1901)
- Pisinna cyclostoma (Tenison Woods, 1877)
- Pisinna dubitabilis (Tate, 1899)
- Pisinna eurychades (R.B.Watson, 1886)
- Pisinna flindersi (Tenison Woods, 1877)
- Pisinna frauenfeldi (Schwartz von Mohrenstern, 1867)
- Pisinna glabrata (Megerle von Mühlfeld, 1824)
- Pisinna gradata Ponder & Yoo, 1976
- Pisinna hipkinsi (Ponder, 1965)
- Pisinna impressa (Hutton, 1885)
- Pisinna incipiens (Laseron, 1956)
- Pisinna insulana (Marwick, 1928)
- Pisinna jacosa (Laws, 1940)
- Pisinna juddi (Ponder, 1968)
- Pisinna kershawi (Tenison Woods, 1878)
- Pisinna kis (Winckworth, 1931)
- Pisinna koruahina (Laws, 1940)
- Pisinna lara (Turton, 1932)
- Pisinna laseroni Ponder & Yoo, 1976
- Pisinna mactanensis Poppe & Tagaro, 2026 (original description)
- Pisinna manawatawhia (Powell, 1937)
- Pisinna megastoma Ponder & Yoo, 1976
- Pisinna micronema (Suter, 1898)
- Pisinna minor (Suter, 1898)
- Pisinna missile (Laws, 1940)
- Pisinna moretonensis Ponder & Yoo, 1976
- Pisinna ngatutura (Laws, 1940)
- Pisinna nitida Ponder & Yoo, 1976
- Pisinna oblata (Laseron, 1956)
- Pisinna olivacea (Frauenfeld, 1867)
- Pisinna paucirugosa Ponder & Yoo, 1976
- Pisinna perdigna (Laseron, 1956)
- Pisinna philippinensis Poppe & Tagaro, 2026 (original description)
- Pisinna polysulcata (Finlay, 1924)
- Pisinna ponderi Palazzi, 1983
- Pisinna praecidecosta (Ponder, 1965)
- Pisinna rekohuana (Powell, 1933)
- Pisinna rekominor (Laws, 1940)
- Pisinna rufoapicata (Suter, 1908)
- Pisinna rugosa (Hutton, 1885)
- Pisinna salebrosa (Frauenfeld, 1867)
- Pisinna semiplicata (Powell, 1927)
- Pisinna semisulcata (Hutton, 1885)
- Pisinna stampinensis Lozouet, 2015
- Pisinna subfusca (Hutton, 1873)
- Pisinna subrufa (Powell, 1937)
- Pisinna subtilicosta (Marwick, 1928)
- Pisinna tasmanica (Tenison Woods, 1876)
- Pisinna tropica (Laseron, 1956)
- Pisinna tumida (Tenison Woods, 1876)
- Pisinna varicifera (Tenison Woods, 1877)
- Pisinna verticostata (Powell & Bartrum, 1929)
- Pisinna vincula (Laseron, 1950)
- Pisinna voorwindei Ponder & Yoo, 1976
- Pisinna zosterophila (Webster, 1905)
