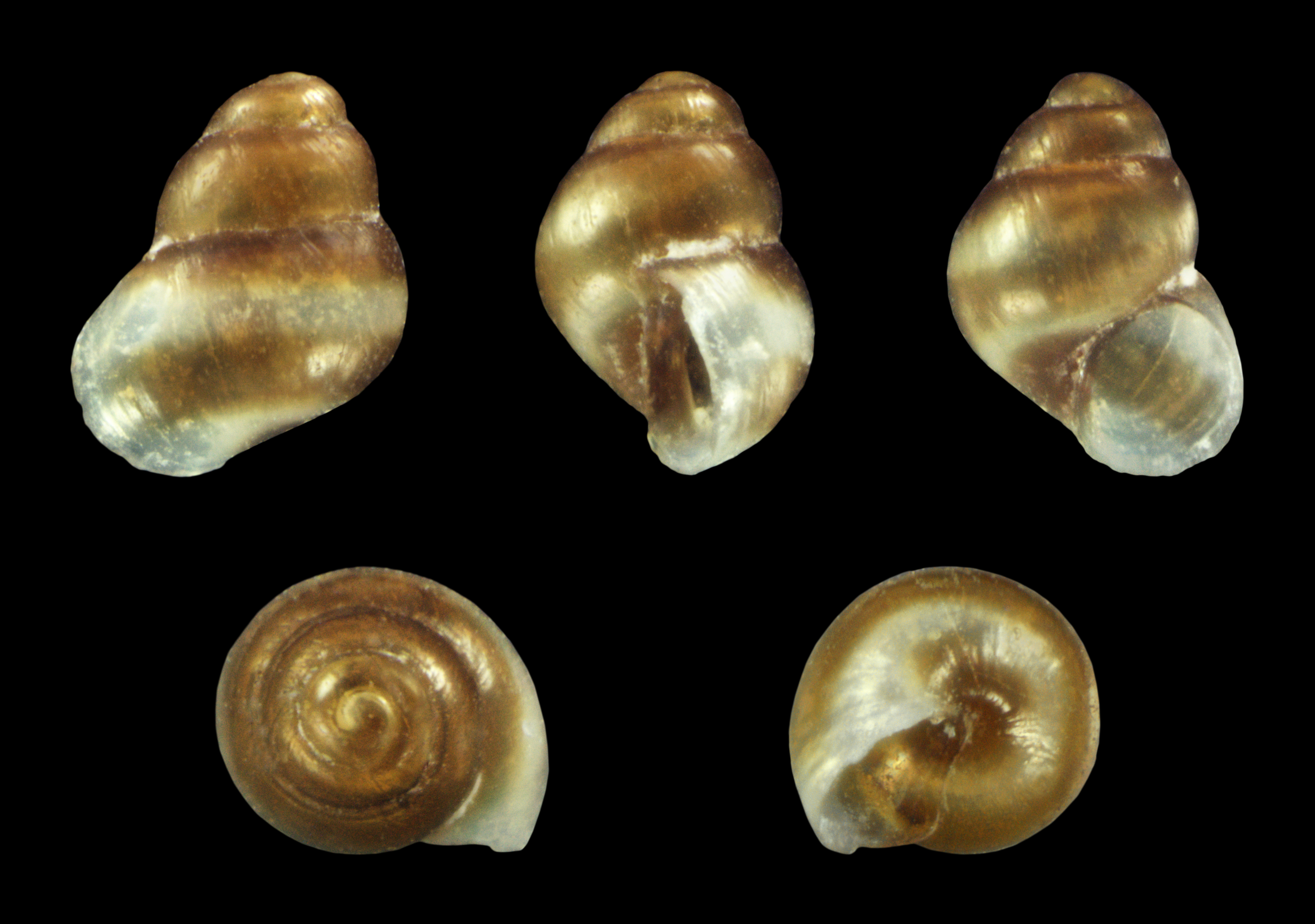
- Eatonina fulgida shell

Scientific classification
- Kingdom: Animalia
- Phylum: Mollusca
- Class: Gastropoda
- Subclass: Caenogastropoda
- Order: Littorinimorpha
- Family: Cingulopsidae
- Genus: Eatonina
- Species: E. fulgida

Binomial name
- Eatonina fulgida (Adams J., 1797)

Synonyms
- Cingulopsis fulgida (J. Adams); Eatonina celata (Monterosato, 1884); Eatonina coelata (Monterosato, 1884)<

= Eatonina fulgida =

Species of gastropod

Eatonina fulgida is a species of small sea snail, a marine gastropod mollusk in the family Cingulopsidae.

== Distribution ==
Ireland
