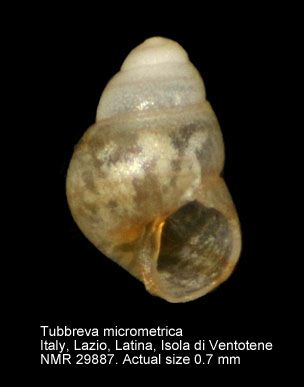

Scientific classification
- Kingdom: Animalia
- Phylum: Mollusca
- Class: Gastropoda
- Subclass: Caenogastropoda
- Order: Littorinimorpha
- Family: Cingulopsidae
- Genus: Tubbreva
- Species: T. micrometrica

Binomial name
- Tubbreva micrometrica (Aradas & Benoit, 1876)

= Tubbreva micrometrica =

Species of gastropod

Tubbreva micrometrica is a species of minute sea snail, a marine gastropod mollusk in the family Cingulopsidae.
