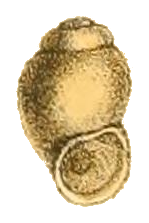
- A drawing of an apertural view of Stenothyra hybocystoides, with operculum in place

Scientific classification
- Kingdom: Animalia
- Phylum: Mollusca
- Class: Gastropoda
- Subclass: Caenogastropoda
- Order: Littorinimorpha
- Superfamily: Truncatelloidea
- Family: Stenothyridae; Tryon, 1866

Diversity
- About 60 freshwater species

= Stenothyridae =

Family of gastropods

Stenothyridae is a family of small freshwater snails, snails with gills and an operculum, aquatic gastropod molluscs in the superfamily Truncatelloidea.

This family has no subfamilies.

== Distribution ==
There are known about 60 freshwater species of Stenothyridae in the Palearctic (6 species), Oriental (about 60 species) and Australasian region (about 5 species) and some marine. There are 19 endemic species of Stenothyridae in the Lower Mekong River flowing through Thailand, Laos and Cambodia.

== Description ==
American malacologist George Washington Tryon firstly defined this taxon as Stenothyrinæ in 1866. Tryon's diagnosis reads as follows:

Stenothyrinæ. Shell turbinate. Operculum subspiral, calcareous. Distribution Indian. Stenothyra, Gabbia.

Currently the genus Gabbia is classified within the family Bithyniidae.

== Genera ==
Genera within the family Stenothyridae include:

- Farsithyra Glöer & Pešić, 2009
- Gangetia Ancey, 1890
- Stenothyra Benson, 1856 - type genus of the family Stenothyridae

== Ecology ==
The habitat of Stenothyridae include rivers, streams and estuaries. Stenothyridae invaded freshwater habitats from marine ones in at least one independent lineage. Some species of Stenothyridae are euryhaline and/or marine. Probably there are some amphidromous (migrate from freshwater to the sea) species of Stenothyridae.
