= Pickenia =

Scientific classification
- Kingdom: Animalia
- Phylum: Mollusca
- Class: Gastropoda
- Subclass: Caenogastropoda
- Order: Littorinimorpha
- Family: Cingulopsidae
- Genus: Pickenia
- Species: P. signyensis

Binomial name
- Pickenia signyensis (Ponder, 1983)

Species of gastropod

Pickenia is a monotypic genus of minute sea snails, a marine gastropod mollusk in the family Cingulopsidae. The only known species is Pickenia signyensis, found on Signy Island in the South Orkney Islands.

== Description ==
The maximum recorded shell length is 1.48 mm. The shell is a pale orange-brown colour, with a yellow-brown aperture. The protoconch is usually dark purple-brown.

The holotype is held by Amgueddfa Cymru – Museum Wales.

== Distribution ==
The species has only been found on Signy Island in the South Orkney Islands. The holotype was collected by G. Picken in 1977.

== Habitat ==
The species' holotypes and paratypes were collected from rocky bottom on algae off the coast of Signy Island. The minimum recorded depth is 4 m. Maximum recorded depth is 10 m.
