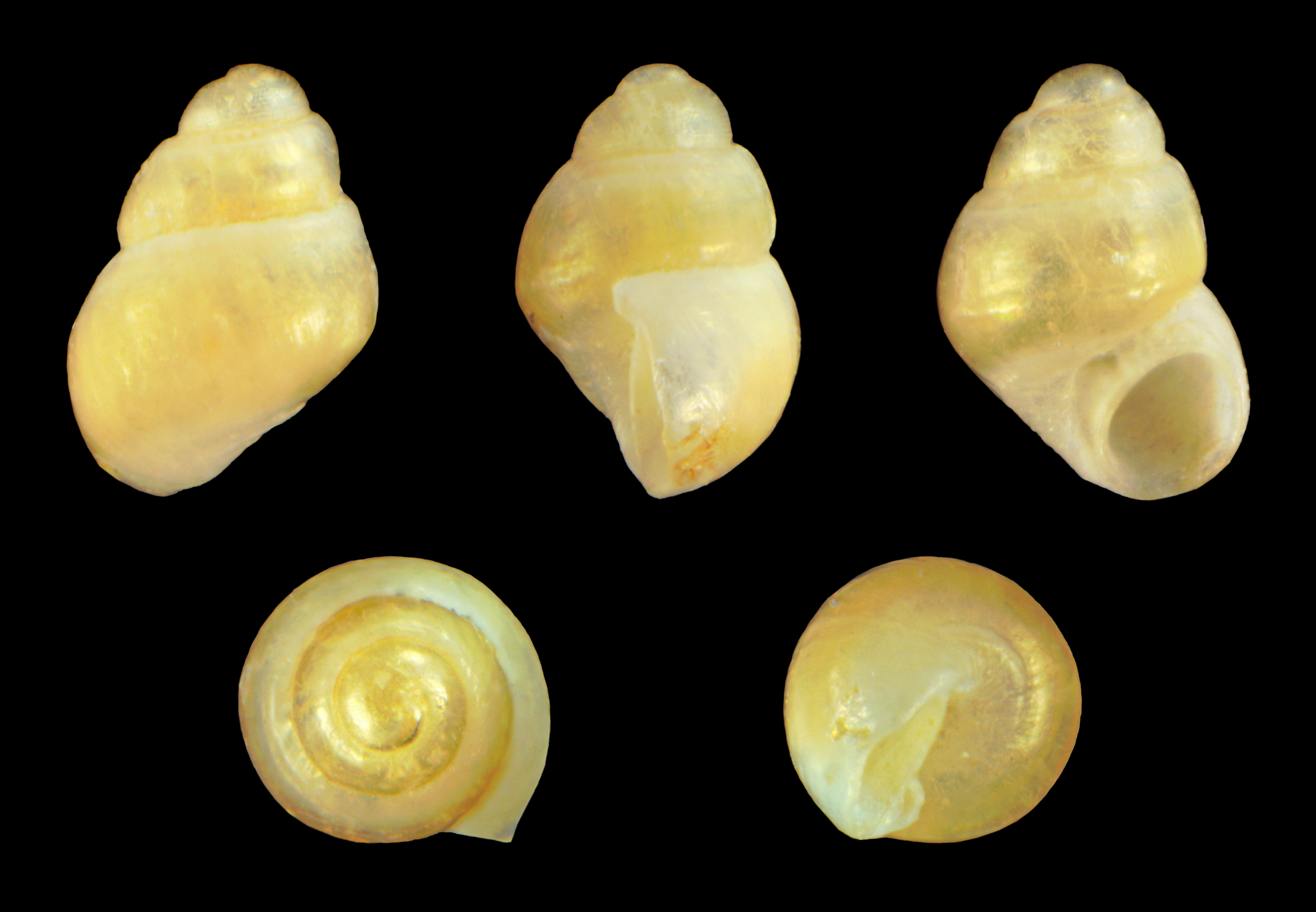
- Amphithalamus vallei Aguayo & Jaume, 1947

Scientific classification
- Kingdom: Animalia
- Phylum: Mollusca
- Class: Gastropoda
- Subclass: Caenogastropoda
- Order: Littorinimorpha
- Family: Anabathridae
- Genus: Amphithalamus; Carpenter, 1864

Type species
- Amphithalamus inclusus P. P. Carpenter, 1864

Synonyms
- Amphitalamus David, 1934 (misspelling); Amphithalamus (Amphithalamus) Carpenter, 1864· accepted, alternate representation; Amphithalamus (Notoscrobs) Powell, 1927· accepted, alternate representation; Amphithalimus [sic] (misspelling); Amphithalmus [sic] (misspelling); Microfossa Laseron, 1950 (synonym); Notoscrobs Powell, 1927; Notoscrobs (Microfossa) Laseron, 1950· accepted, alternate representation; Obescrobs Iredale, 1955 (synonym); Rissoa (Amphithalamus) Carpenter, 1864

= Amphithalamus =

Genus of gastropods

Amphitalhamus is a genus of minute sea snails, marine gastropod mollusks or micromollusks in the family Anabathridae.

== Species ==
Species within the genus Amphithalamus include:

- Amphithalamus albus Rolán, 1991
- Amphithalamus erosus (Odhner, 1924)
- Amphithalamus falsestea (Ponder, 1968)
- Amphithalamus fulcira (Laseron, 1956)
- Amphithalamus glabrus Simone, 1996
- † Amphithalamus immigrus Lozouet, 1998
- Amphithalamus incidatus (Frauenfeld, 1867)
- Amphithalamus inclusus Carpenter, 1864
- Amphithalamus jacksoni (Brazier, 1895)
- Amphithalamus latisulcus (Ponder, 1968)
- Amphithalamus liratus Thiele, 1930
- Amphithalamus maoria (Ponder, 1968)
- Amphithalamus neglectus (Turton, 1932)
- Amphithalamus niger Rolán, 1991
- Amphithalamus obesus H. Adams, 1866
- Amphithalamus ornatus (Powell, 1927)
- Amphithalamus pyramis (Laseron, 1950)
- Amphithalamus rauli Rolán, 1991
- Amphithalamus semen (Odhner, 1924)
- † Amphithalamus semiornatus (Laws, 1948)
- Amphithalamus sundayensis Oliver, 1915
- Amphithalamus triangulus May, 1915
- Amphithalamus vallei Aguayo & Jaume, 1947
- † Amphithalamus waitemata (Laws, 1950)

== Synonyms ==
- Amphithalamus africanus Bartsch, 1915: synonym of Afriscrobs africanus (Bartsch, 1915) (original combination)
- Amphithalamus alphesboei Melvill, 1912: synonym of Pseudonoba ictriella (Melvill, 1910) (junior subjective synonym)
- Amphithalamus annamiticus (Dautzenberg & H. Fischer, 1907): synonym of Barleeia annamitica (Dautzenberg & H. Fischer, 1907) (superseded combination)
- Amphithalamus aurantiocinctus May, 1915: synonym of Crassitoniella erratica (May, 1913) (junior subjective synonym)
- Amphithalamus capricorneus Hedley, 1907: synonym of Eatonina capricornea (Hedley, 1907) (superseded combination)
- Amphithalamus costatus Hedley, 1911: synonym of Pisinna costata (Hedley, 1911) (superseded combination)
- Amphithalamus denseplicatus W. H. Turton, 1932: synonym of Afriscrobs africanus (Bartsch, 1915)
- Amphithalamus dysbatus Pilsbry & T. L. McGinty, 1949: synonym of Floridiscrobs dysbatus (Pilsbry & T. L. McGinty, 1949) (original combination)
- Amphithalamus elspethae Melvill, 1910: synonym of Chevallieria columen (Melvill, 1904) (junior subjective synonym)
- Amphithalamus erratica May, 1913: synonym of Crassitoniella erratica (May, 1913) (original combination)
- Amphithalamus hedleyi (Suter, 1908): synonym of Anabathron hedleyi (Suter, 1908) (superseded combination)
- Amphithalamus imitator Thiele, 1930: synonym of Haurakia imitator (Thiele, 1930) (original combination)
- Amphithalamus kohllarseni David, 1934: synonym of Pisinna minor (Suter, 1898) (junior subjective synonym)
- Amphithalamus luteofuscus May, 1920: synonym of Anabathron luteofuscum (May, 1920) (original combination)
- Amphithalamus muiri Barnard, 1963: synonym of Afriscrobs muiri (Barnard, 1963) (original combination)
- Amphithalamus multistriatus W. H. Turton, 1932: synonym of Afriscrobs africanus (Bartsch, 1915)
- Amphithalamus myersi Ladd, 1966: synonym of Protobarleeia myersi (Ladd, 1966)
- Amphithalamus pertumidus May, 1915: synonym of Onoba pertumida (May, 1915) (original combination)
- Amphithalamus psomus Melvill, 1918: synonym of Iravadia delicata (R. A. Philippi, 1849): synonym of Pseudonoba delicata (R. A. Philippi, 1849) (junior subjective synonym)
- Amphithalamus pupoideus H. Adams, 1865: synonym of Badepigrus pupoideus (H. Adams, 1865) (unaccepted > superseded combination)
- Amphithalamus stephensae Bartsch, 1927: synonym of Amphithalamus inclusus P. P. Carpenter, 1864 (junior subjective synonym)
- Amphithalamus tenuis Bartsch, 1911: synonym of Amphithalamus inclusus P. P. Carpenter, 1864
- Amphithalamus tiara May, 1915: synonym of Onoba tiara (May, 1915) (original combination)
- Amphithalamus trosti Strong & Hertlein, 1939: synonym of Amphithalamus inclusus P. P. Carpenter, 1864
- Amphithalamus turtoni Bartsch, 1915: synonym of Afriscrobs turtoni (Bartsch, 1915) (original combination).

== Taxon inquirendum ==
- Amphithalamus sowerbyi W. H. Turton, 1932
