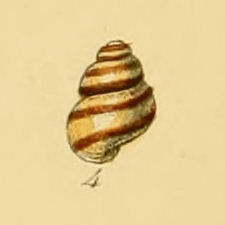
- Eatonina fulgida shell

Scientific classification
- Kingdom: Animalia
- Phylum: Mollusca
- Class: Gastropoda
- Subclass: Caenogastropoda
- Order: Littorinimorpha
- Superfamily: Cingulopsoidea
- Family: Cingulopsidae
- Genus: Eatonina; Thiele, 1912

Synonyms
- Cingulopsis Fretter & Patil, 1958; Coriandria Tomlin, 1917; Eatonina (Captitonia) Ponder & Yoo, 1980 · accepted, alternate representation; Eatonina (Mistostigma) Berry, 1947 · accepted, alternate representation; Eatonina (Otatara) Ponder, 1965 · accepted, alternate representation; Eatonina (Saginofusca) Ponder, 1965 · accepted, alternate representation; Microsetia Monterosato, 1884 (preoccupied by Microsetia Stephens, 1829)

= Eatonina =

Genus of gastropods

Eatonina is a genus of minute sea snails, marine gastropod mollusks in the family Cingulopsidae.

== Species ==
Species within the genus Eatonina include:

- Eatonina albachiarae Perugia, 2011
- Eatonina ardeae Ponder & Yoo, 1980
- Eatonina atomaria (Powell, 1933)
- Eatonina capricornea (Hedley, 1907)
- Eatonina caribaea (Faber, 2005)
- Eatonina colorata Ponder & Yoo, 1980
- Eatonina condita Ponder & Yoo, 1980
- Eatonina cossurae (Calcara, 1841)
- Eatonina crassicarinata (Powell, 1937)
- Eatonina dilecta (Turton, 1932)
- Eatonina fulgida (Adams J., 1797)
- Eatonina fulvicolumella Ponder & Yoo, 1980
- Eatonina fusca (d'Orbigny, 1840)
- Eatonina fuscoelongata Rolán & Hernández, 2006
- Eatonina halia (Bartsch, 1915)
- Eatonina hedleyi Ponder & Yoo, 1980
- Eatonina heliciformis Ponder & Yoo, 1980
- Eatonina hutchingsae Ponder & Yoo, 1980
- Eatonina kitanagato Fukuda, Nakamura & Yamashita, 1998
- Eatonina lactea Ponder & Yoo, 1980
- Eatonina laurensi Moolenbeek & Faber, 1991
- Eatonina lirata Ponder & Yoo, 1980
- Eatonina lunata (Laseron, 1956)
- Eatonina maculosa Ponder, 1965
- Eatonina maickeli Rolán & Fernández-Garcés, 2015
- Eatonina martae Rolán & Templado, 1993
- Eatonina matildae Rubio & Rodriguez Babio, 1996
- Eatonina micans (Webster, 1905)
- Eatonina ochroleuca (Brusina, 1869)
- Eatonina ordofasciarum Rolán & Hernández, 2006
- Eatonina pulicaria (Fischer, 1873)
- Eatonina pumila (Monterosato, 1884)
- Eatonina pusilla (Thiele, 1912)
- Eatonina rubicunda Ponder & Yoo, 1980
- Eatonina rubrilabiata Ponder & Yoo, 1980
- Eatonina sanguinolenta Ponder & Yoo, 1980
- Eatonina shirleyae Ponder & Yoo, 1980
- Eatonina striata Ponder & Yoo, 1980
- Eatonina subflavescens (Iredale, 1915)
- Eatonina vermeuleni Moolenbeek, 1986
- Eatonina voorwindei Ponder & Yoo, 1980

Species brought into synonymy

- Eatonina celata (Monterosato, 1884): synonym of Eatonina fulgida (Adams J., 1797)
- Eatonina coelata (Monterosato, 1884): synonym of Eatonina fulgida (Adams J., 1797)
