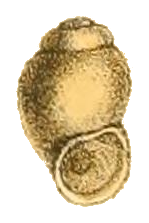
- drawing of apertural view of Stenothyra hybocystoides

Scientific classification
- Kingdom: Animalia
- Phylum: Mollusca
- Class: Gastropoda
- Subclass: Caenogastropoda
- Order: Littorinimorpha
- Family: Stenothyridae
- Genus: Stenothyra; Benson, 1856

Type species
- Nematura deltae Benson, 1837

Diversity
- Over 50 species

Synonyms
- Cochliopopsis Mori, 1938; Incolaestuarium Kuroda, 1962; Nematura Benson, 1837 (invalid: junior homonym of Nematura Fischer von Waldheim, 1813 [Aves]; Stenothyra is a replacement name); Obesitena Iredale, 1943

= Stenothyra =

Genus of gastropods

Stenothyra is a genus of freshwater snails which have a gill and an operculum, aquatic gastropod mollusks in the family Stenothyridae.

Stenothyra is the type genus of the family Stenothyridae.

== Distribution ==
The distribution of Stenothyra includes China and Malaysia.

== Species ==
Species within the genus Stenothyra include:

- Stenothyra acuta Brandt, 1974
- Stenothyra annandalei Brandt, 1968
- Stenothyra arabica Neubert, 1998
- Stenothyra australis Hedley, 1901
- Stenothyra basiangulata (Mori, 1938)
- Stenothyra basisculpta Brandt, 1970
- † Stenothyra bellardii (Dollfus & Dautzenberg, 1886)
- Stenothyra cambodiensis Brandt, 1971
- Stenothyra confinis Brandt, 1974
- Stenothyra crooki Brandt, 1968
- Stenothyra cyrtochila van Benthem Jutting, 1959
- Stenothyra deltae (Benson, 1837)
- Stenothyra divalis (Gould, 1859)
- Stenothyra edogawensis (Yokoyama, 1927)
- Stenothyra fasciataBrandt, 1968
- Stenothyra filipino S.-I Huang, M.-H. Lin, 2022
- Stenothyra gelasinosa Golding, 2014
- Stenothyra glabrata (A. Adams, 1851)
- Stenothyra hardouini de Morgan, 1885
- Stenothyra hokkaidonis Kuroda, 1962
- Stenothyra huaimoi ..., 1979
- Stenothyra hunanensis Moellendorff, 1888
- Stenothyra hybocystoides Bavay, 1895
- Stenothyra japonicaKuroda, 1962
- Stenothyra jinghongensis Davis, Guo & Hoagland, 1986
- Stenothyra jiraponi Brandt, 1968
- Stenothyra khongi ..., 1979
- Stenothyra koratensis Brandt, 1968
- Stenothyra krungtepensis Brandt, 1968
- Stenothyra labiata Brandt, 1968
- Stenothyra maculata Brandt, 1974
- Stenothyra mandahlbarthi Brandt, 1968
- Stenothyra mcmulleni Brandt, 1970
- Stenothyra messageri
- Stenothyra microsculpta Brandt, 1974
- Stenothyra minima (G. B. Sowerby I, 1837)
- Stenothyra monilifera (Benson, 1856)
- Stenothyra moussoni Martens, 1897
- Stenothyra nana Prashad, 1921
- Stenothyra ovalis Brandt, 1970
- Stenothyra paludicola van Benthem Jutting, 1963
- Stenothyra polita (A. Adams, 1851)
- Stenothyra prasongi Brandt, 1974
- Stenothyra recondita Lindholm, 1929
- Stenothyra roseni Brandt, 1968
- Stenothyra saccata van Benthem Jutting, 1963
- Stenothyra schlickumi Brandt, 1968
- Stenothyra schuetti Brandt, 1968
- Stenothyra spinosa Brandt, 1974
- Stenothyra spiralis Brandt, 1968
- Stenothyra thermaecola Kuroda, 1962
- Stenothyra wykoffi

Species brought into synonymy

- Stenothyra nebularum van Benthem Jutting, 1963: synonym of Stenothyra australis Hedley, 1901
- Stenothyra quadrasi Möllendorff, 1895: synonym of Stenothyra polita (A. Adams, 1851)

Nomen dubium

- Stenothyra frustillum Benson, 1856
