= Lernaeodiscidae =

Family of barnacles

In the past, Lernaeodiscidae has been considered a family of barnacles. Research published in 2021 by Chan et al. resulted in the genera of Lernaeodiscidae being merged with that of Peltogastridae, which now contains the members of both families. As an exception, the species Triangulus galatheae was moved to the genus Paratriangulus in the family Triangulidae.

== See also ==
Peltogastridae
