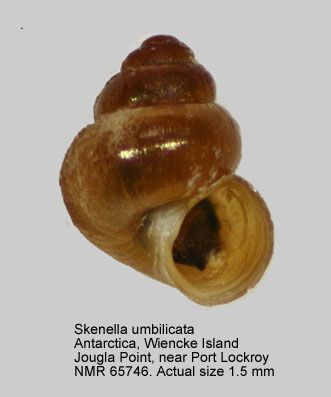
- Skenella umbilicata

Scientific classification
- Kingdom: Animalia
- Phylum: Mollusca
- Class: Gastropoda
- Subclass: Caenogastropoda
- Order: Littorinimorpha
- Family: Cingulopsidae
- Genus: Skenella von Martens & Pfeffer, 1886

Type species
- Skenella georgiana Pfeffer, G. in Martens, E.C. von & G. Pfeffer, 1886

Synonyms
- Eatoniopsis Thiele, 1912; Rufodardanula Ponder, 1965; Skenella (Boogina) Thiele, 1913 · accepted, alternate representation; Skenella (Rufodardanula) Ponder, 1965 · accepted, alternate representation; Skenella (Skenella) Pfeffer, 1886· accepted, alternate representation

= Skenella =

Genus of gastropods

Skenella is a genus of minute sea snails, marine gastropod mollusks in the family Cingulopsidae.

== Species ==
Species within the genus Skenella include:

- Skenella castanea (Laseron, 1950)
- Skenella conica (Kay, 1979)
- Skenella edwardiensis (Watson, 1886)
- Skenella georgiana Pfeffer, 1886
- Skenella hallae Ponder & Worsfold, 1994
- Skenella paludinoides (Smith, 1902)
- Skenella pfefferi Suter, 1909
- Skenella ponderi (Kay, 1979)
- Skenella porcellana (Ponder & Yoo, 1980)
- Skenella sinapi (Watson, 1886)
- Skenella spadix (Ponder, 1965)
- Skenella translucida (Ponder & Yoo, 1980)
- Skenella umbilicata Ponder, 1983
- Skenella wareni Ponder & Worsfold, 1994
- Skenella westralis (Ponder & Yoo, 1980)

Species brought into synonymy

- Skenella minima Thiele, 1925: synonym of Eatoniella minima (Thiele, 1925)
