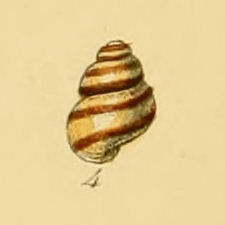
- Eatonina fulgida shell

Scientific classification
- Kingdom: Animalia
- Phylum: Mollusca
- Class: Gastropoda
- Subclass: Caenogastropoda
- Order: Littorinimorpha
- Superfamily: Cingulopsoidea
- Family: Cingulopsidae; Fretter & Patil, 1958

Genera
- See text

Synonyms
- Coriandriidae F. Nordsieck, 1972; Eatoniopsinae Ponder, 1965; Eatoninidae Golikov & Starobogatov, 1975

= Cingulopsidae =

Family of gastropods

Cingulopsidae is a family of sea snails, marine gastropod molluscs in the order Littorinimorpha.

According to taxonomy of the Gastropoda by Bouchet & Rocroi (2005) the family Cingulopsidae has no subfamilies.

== Genera and species ==
Genera and species within the Cingulopsidae include:

- † Dieretostoma Cossmann, 1888
- Eatonina Thiele, 1912
- Pickenia Ponder, 1983
- Pseudopisinna Ponder & Yoo, 1980
- Skenella Pfeffer, 1886
- Tubbreva Ponder, 1965
  - Tubbreva exaltata
  - Tubbreva micrometrica Aradas & Benoit, 1876

Genera brought into synonymy

- Cingulopsis Fretter & Patil, 1958: synonym of Eatonina Thiele, 1912
- Coriandria Tomlin, 1917: synonym of Eatonina Thiele, 1912
- Eatoniopsis Ponder, 1965: synonym of Skenella Pfeffer, 1886
- Microsetia Monterosato, 1884: synonym of Eatonina Thiele, 1912
