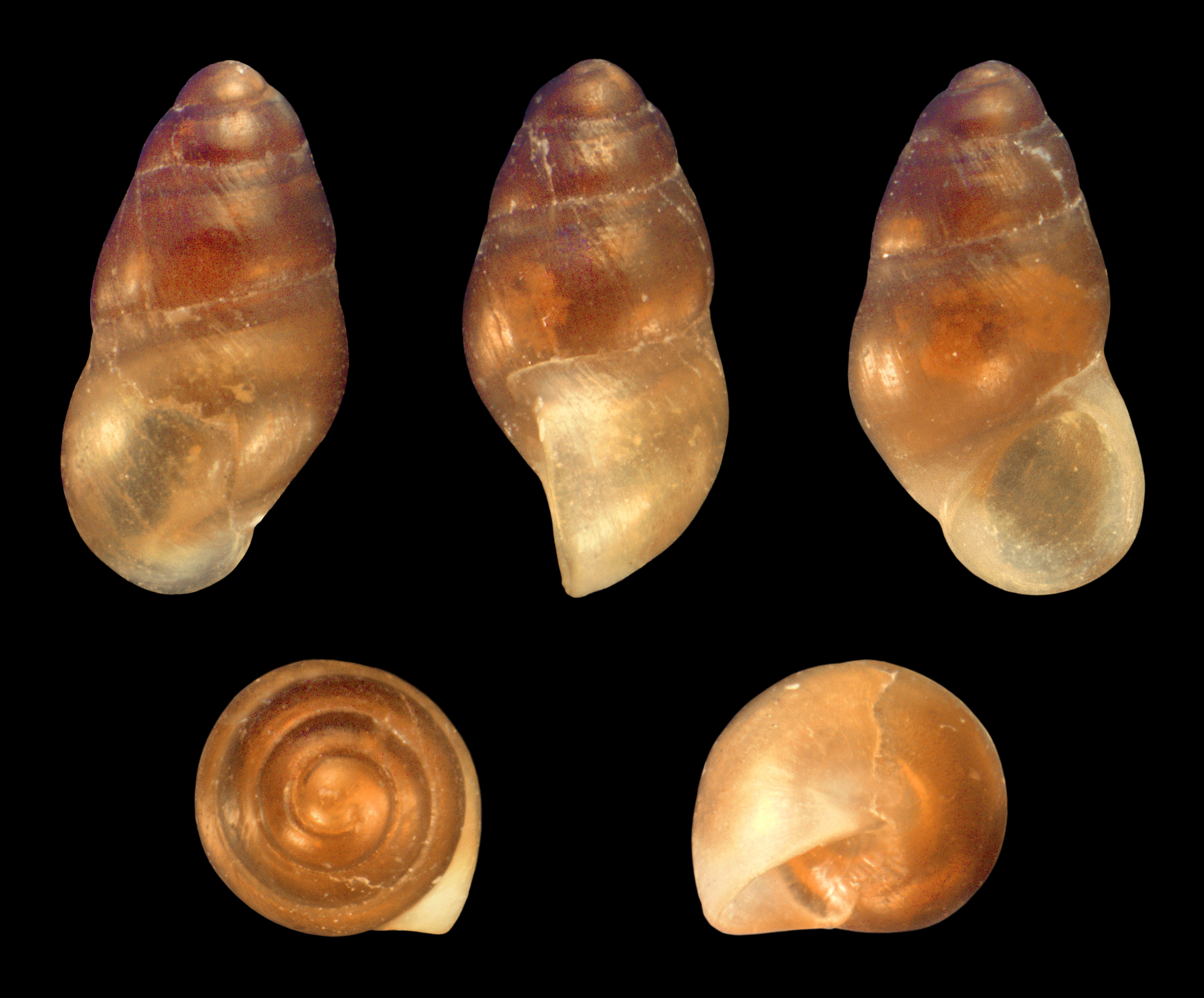
- Pisinna glabrata shell

Scientific classification
- Kingdom: Animalia
- Phylum: Mollusca
- Class: Gastropoda
- Subclass: Caenogastropoda
- Order: Littorinimorpha
- Superfamily: Truncatelloidea
- Family: Anabathridae; Keen, 1971

= Anabathridae =

Family of gastropods

Anabathridae is a family of sea snails, marine gastropod molluscs in the order Littorinimorpha.

== Genera ==
- Genus Afriscrobs W.F. Ponder, 1983
  - Afriscrobs adjacens (E. A. Smith, 1910)
  - Afriscrobs africanus (Bartsch, 1915)
  - Afriscrobs minutissimus (Turton, 1932)
  - Afriscrobs muiri (Barnard, 1963)
  - Afriscrobs quantilla (Turton, 1932)
  - Afriscrobs saldadinensis (Hornung & Mermod, 1928)
  - Afriscrobs turtoni (Bartsch, 1915)
- Genus Amphithalamus Carpenter, 1864
- Genus Anabathron G.R. von Frauenfeld, 1867
  - sometimes there are recognized subgenera Anabathron G.R. von Frauenfeld, 1867 and Scrobs Watson, 1886
  - Anabathron angulatum (Powell, 1927)
  - Anabathron ascensum Hedley, 1907
  - †Anabathron bartrumi (Laws, 1950)
  - †Anabathron chattonensis (Laws, 1948)
  - Anabathron contabulatum Frauenfeld, 1867
  - Anabathron elongatum (Powell, 1927)
  - Anabathron excelsum (Powell, 1933)
  - Anabathron hedleyi (Suter, 1908)
  - †Anabathron kaawaensis (Laws, 1936)
  - †Anabathron latoscrobis (Laws, 1948)
  - Anabathron lene Hedley, 1918
  - Anabathron luteofuscum (May, 1919)
  - Anabathron ovatum (Powell, 1927)
  - Anabathron pluteus (Laseron, 1950)
  - †Anabathron praeco (Laws, 1941)
  - †Anabathron quartus (Laws, 1950)
  - Anabathron rugulosum (Powell, 1930)
  - Anabathron scrobiculator (Watson, 1886)
  - †Anabathron scrobis (Laws, 1950)
  - Anabathron trailli (Powell, 1939)
- Genus Badepigrus Iredale, 1955: (unaccepted > unavailable name)
- Genus Microdryas C.F. Laseron, 1950
- Genus Nodulus Monterosato, 1878
- Genus Pisinna T.A. di Monterosato, 1878
- Genus Pseudestea W.F. Ponder, 1967
  - Pseudestea crassiconus (Powell, 1933)
  - Pseudestea pyramidata (Hedley, 1903)

Genera brought into synonymy

- Estea Iredale, 1915: synonym of Pisinna Monterosato, 1878
- Feldestea Iredale, 1955 : synonym of Pisinna Monterosato, 1878
- Hagenmulleria Bourguignat, 1881: synonym of Pisinna Monterosato, 1878
- Laseronula Whitley, 1959 : synonym of Badepigrus Iredale, 1955 (junior subjective synonym)
- Microestea Ponder, 1965: synonym of Pisinna Monterosato, 1878
- Microfossa C.F. Laseron: synonym of Amphithalamus P. P. Carpenter, 1864
- Nannoscrobs Finlay, 1926: synonym of Scrobs Watson, 1886: synonym of Anabathron Frauenfeld, 1867
- Nodulestea Iredale, 1955: synonym of Pisinna Monterosato, 1878
- Notoscrobs A. W. B. Powell, 1927 : synonym of Amphithalamus (Notoscrobs) A. W. B. Powell, 1927 represented as Amphithalamus P. P. Carpenter, 1864
- Obescrobs Iredale, 1955 : synonym of Amphithalamus P. P. Carpenter, 1864
- Saltatricula Laseron, 1956 : synonym of Badepigrus Iredale, 1955 (junior homonym, non Burmeister, 1861)
- Scrobs Watson, 1886: synonym of Anabathron Frauenfeld, 1867
