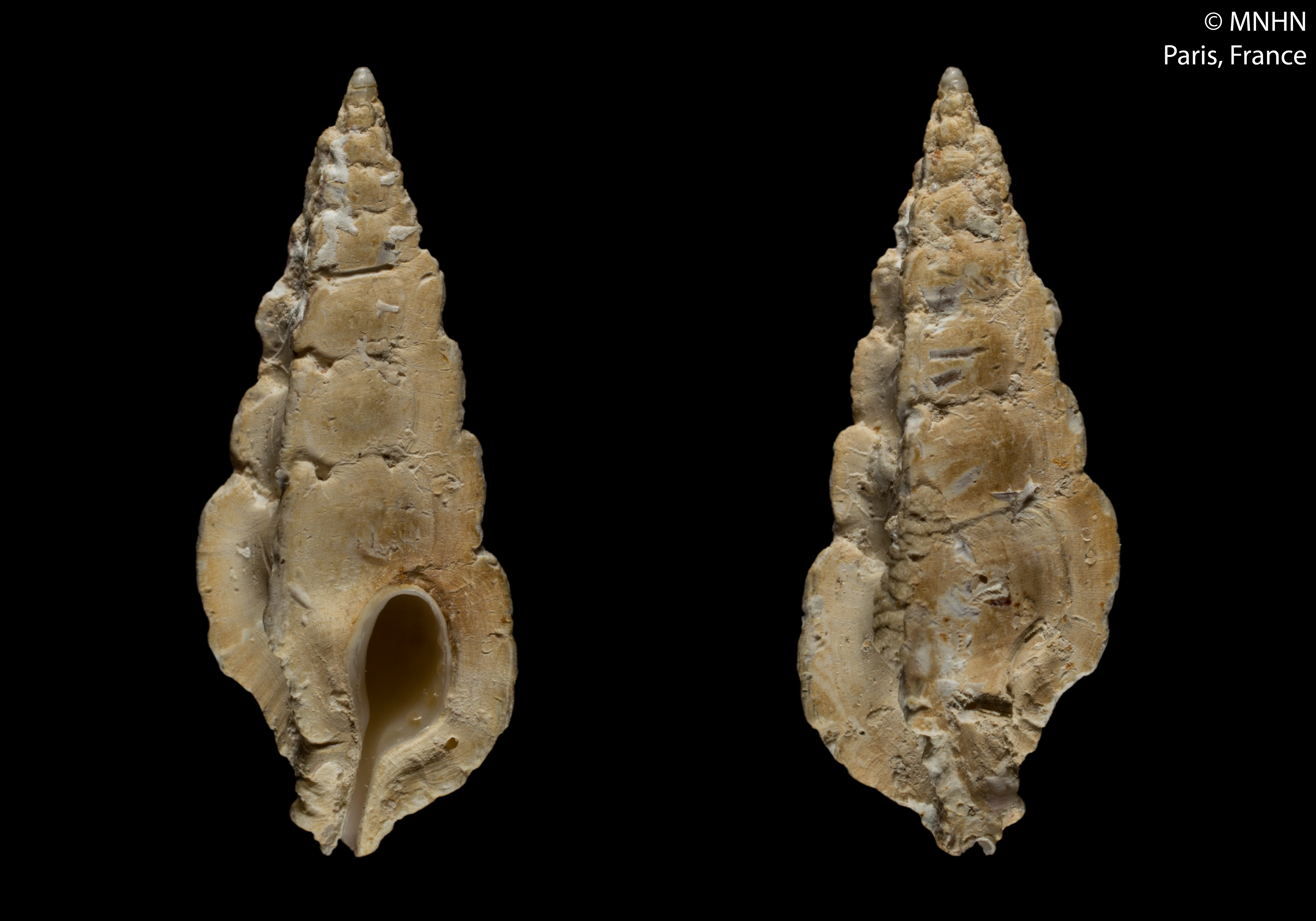
- Shell of Aspella aclydis (holotype at MNHN, Paris)

Scientific classification
- Kingdom: Animalia
- Phylum: Mollusca
- Class: Gastropoda
- Subclass: Caenogastropoda
- Order: Neogastropoda
- Superfamily: Muricoidea
- Family: Muricidae
- Subfamily: Aspellinae
- Genus: Aspella; Mörch, 1877

Type species
- Ranella anceps Lamarck, 1822

Species
- See text

Synonyms
- Ranella (Aspella) Mörch, 1877 (original rank)

= Aspella =

Genus of gastropods

Aspella is a genus of sea snails, marine gastropod mollusks in the family Muricidae, the murex snails or rock snails.

== Species ==
Species within the genus Aspella include:

- Aspella aclydis Houart, 2017
- Aspella acuticostata (Turton, 1932)
- Aspella anceps (Lamarck, 1822)
- Aspella castor Radwin & D'Attilio, 1976
- Aspella cryptica Radwin & D'Attilio, 1976
- Aspella hastula (Reeve, 1844)
- Aspella helenae Houart & Tröndlé, 2008
- Aspella hildrunae Houart & Tröndle, 2008
- Aspella lorenzi Houart, 2019
- Aspella lozoueti Houart & Tröndlé, 2008
- Aspella mauritiana Radwin & D'Attilio, 1976
- Aspella media Houart, 1987
- Aspella morchi Radwin & D'Attilio, 1976
- Aspella omanensis Houart, Gori & Rosado, 2017
- Aspella platylaevis Radwin & d'Attilio, 1976
- Aspella pollux Radwin & D'Attilio, 1976
- Aspella ponderi Radwin & D'Attilio, 1976
- Aspella producta (Pease, 1861)
- Aspella pyramidalis (Broderip, 1833)
- Aspella schroederi Houart, 1996
- Aspella senex Dall, 1903
- Aspella strepta Vokes, 1985
- Aspella thomassini Houart, 1985
- Aspella vokesiana Houart, 1983

Species brought into synonymy

- Aspella bakeri Hertlein & A. M. Strong, 1951: synonym of Dermomurex bakeri (Hertlein & A. M. Strong, 1951) (original combination)
- Aspella elizabethae McGinty, 1940: synonym of Dermomurex elizabethae (McGinty, 1940) (original combination)
- Aspella paupercula (C. B. Adams, 1850): synonym of Dermomurex pauperculus (C. B. Adams, 1850)
- Aspella undata Hedley, 1907: synonym of Austroclavus undatus (Hedley, 1907) (original combination)
