= A. pyramidalis =

A. pyramidalis may refer to:

- Actinostrobus pyramidalis, the swamp cypress, a coniferous tree species endemic to southwestern Western Australia
- Aechmea pyramidalis, a plant species native to Ecuador
- Ajuga pyramidalis, a flowering plant species native to Europe
- Anacamptis pyramidalis, the pyramidal orchid, a plant species native to southwestern Eurasia
- Aspella pyramidalis, a sea snail species

== See also ==
- Pyramidalis (disambiguation)
