= Murex brevispina ornamentalis =

Scientific classification
- Kingdom: Animalia
- Phylum: Mollusca
- Class: Gastropoda
- Subclass: Caenogastropoda
- Order: Neogastropoda
- Family: Muricidae
- Genus: Murex
- Species: M. brevispina
- Subspecies: M. b. ornamentalis

Trinomial name
- Murex brevispina ornamentalis Ponder & Vokes, 1988

Synonyms
- Murex (Murex) brevispina ornamentalis Ponder & Vokes, 1988· accepted, alternate representation

Species of gastropod

Murex brevispina ornamentalis is a subspecies of sea snail, a marine gastropod mollusc in the family Muricidae, the murex snails or rock snails.
