= N. pyramidalis =

N. pyramidalis may refer to:

- Nodilittorina pyramidalis, a sea snail species
- Nucella pyramidalis, a sea snail species

== See also ==
- Pyramidalis (disambiguation)
