= Dermomurex binghamae =

Scientific classification
- Kingdom: Animalia
- Phylum: Mollusca
- Class: Gastropoda
- Subclass: Caenogastropoda
- Order: Neogastropoda
- Family: Muricidae
- Genus: Dermomurex
- Species: D. binghamae

Binomial name
- Dermomurex binghamae Vokes, 1992

Synonyms
- Dermomurex (Dermomurex) binghamae Vokes, 1992

Species of gastropod

Dermomurex binghamae is a species of sea snail, a marine gastropod mollusk in the family Muricidae, the murex snails or rock snails.

== Description ==
The shell grows to a length of 20 mm.

== Distribution ==
This species occurs in the Atlantic Ocean off the Bahamas.

== Discovery ==
The species was discovered in 1992 by Emily Vokes, a malacologist most well-known for her murex snail expertise.
