= Dermomurex gunteri =

Scientific classification
- Kingdom: Animalia
- Phylum: Mollusca
- Class: Gastropoda
- Subclass: Caenogastropoda
- Order: Neogastropoda
- Family: Muricidae
- Genus: Dermomurex
- Species: D. gunteri

Binomial name
- Dermomurex gunteri Vokes, 1985

Synonyms
- Dermomurex (Dermomurex) gunteri Vokes, 1985

Species of gastropod

Dermomurex gunteri is a species of sea snail, a marine gastropod mollusk in the family Muricidae, the murex snails or rock snails.

== Description ==
The shell grows to a length of 20 mm.

== Distribution ==
This species occurs in the Pacific Ocean off Panama.
