= Dermomurex antonius =

Scientific classification
- Kingdom: Animalia
- Phylum: Mollusca
- Class: Gastropoda
- Subclass: Caenogastropoda
- Order: Neogastropoda
- Family: Muricidae
- Genus: Dermomurex
- Species: D. antonius

Binomial name
- Dermomurex antonius Vokes, 1974

Synonyms
- Dermomurex (Viator) antonius Vokes, 1974

Species of gastropod

Dermomurex antonius is a species of sea snail, a marine gastropod mollusk in the family Muricidae, the murex snails or rock snails.

== Description ==
The length of the shell varies between 15 mm and 26 mm.

== Distribution ==
This marine species occurs off Northwest Australia.
