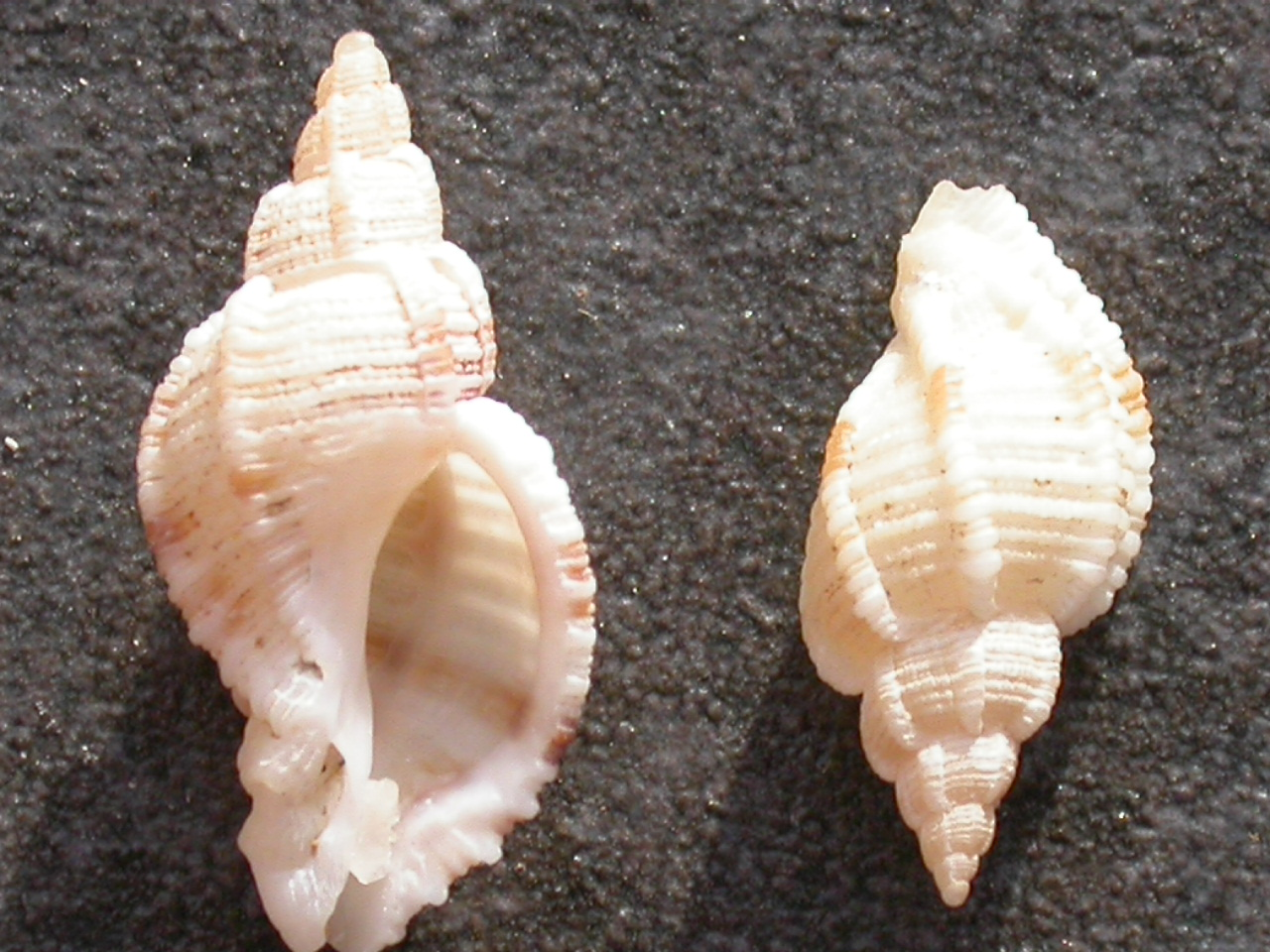
- Phyllocoma speciosa

Scientific classification
- Kingdom: Animalia
- Phylum: Mollusca
- Class: Gastropoda
- Subclass: Caenogastropoda
- Order: Neogastropoda
- Superfamily: Muricoidea
- Family: Muricidae
- Subfamily: Muricinae
- Genus: Phyllocoma; Tapparone Canefri, 1881

Type species
- Triton convolutus Broderip, 1833

Synonyms
- Craspedotriton Dall, 1904; Epidromus (Phyllocoma) Tapparone Canefri, 1881 (original rank); Galfridus Iredale, 1924; Phyllocoma (Galfridus) Iredale, 1924· accepted, alternate representation; Phyllocoma (Phyllocoma) Tapparone Canefri, 1881· accepted, alternate representation

= Phyllocoma =

Genus of gastropods

Phyllocoma is a genus of sea snails, marine gastropod molluscs in the family Muricidae, the murex snails or rock snails.

== Species ==
Species within the genus Phyllocoma include

- Phyllocoma convoluta (Broderip, 1833)
- Phyllocoma platyca Houart, 2001
- Phyllocoma scalariformis (Broderip, 1833)
- Phyllocoma speciosa (Angas, 1871)

.Synonyms:

- Phyllocoma neglecta Habe & Kosuge, 1971: synonym of Dermomurex neglectus (Habe & Kosuge, 1971) (original combination)
- Phyllocoma sculptilis (Reeve, 1846): synonym of Phrygiomurex sculptilis (Reeve, 1844)
