= Dermomurex olssoni =

Scientific classification
- Kingdom: Animalia
- Phylum: Mollusca
- Class: Gastropoda
- Subclass: Caenogastropoda
- Order: Neogastropoda
- Family: Muricidae
- Genus: Dermomurex
- Species: D. olssoni

Binomial name
- Dermomurex olssoni Vokes, 1989

Synonyms
- Dermomurex (Dermodurex) olssoni Vokes, 1989

Species of gastropod

Dermomurex olssoni is a species of sea snail, a marine gastropod mollusk in the family Muricidae, the murex snails or rock snails.

== Description ==
The length of the shell varies between 20 mm and 24 mm. It is described as a fossil.

== Distribution ==
This species occurs in the Caribbean Sea off Honduras and the Dominican Republic; and in the Atlantic Ocean off the Bahamas.
