= Dermomurex agnesae =

Scientific classification
- Kingdom: Animalia
- Phylum: Mollusca
- Class: Gastropoda
- Subclass: Caenogastropoda
- Order: Neogastropoda
- Family: Muricidae
- Genus: Dermomurex
- Species: D. agnesae

Binomial name
- Dermomurex agnesae Vokes, 1995

Synonyms
- Dermomurex (Dermomurex) agnesae Vokes, 1995

Species of gastropod

Dermomurex agnesae is a species of sea snail, a marine gastropod mollusk in the family Muricidae, the murex snails or rock snails.

== Description ==
The length of the shell varies between 12 mm and 14 mm.

== Distribution ==
This marine species occurs off Southwest Australia.
