= Dermomurex infrons =

Scientific classification
- Kingdom: Animalia
- Phylum: Mollusca
- Class: Gastropoda
- Subclass: Caenogastropoda
- Order: Neogastropoda
- Family: Muricidae
- Genus: Dermomurex
- Species: D. infrons

Binomial name
- Dermomurex infrons Vokes, 1974

Synonyms
- Dermomurex (Takia) infrons Vokes, 1974; Murex inermis Sowerby, 1841 (Invalid: junior homonym of Murex inermis Philippi, 1836; Dermomurex infrons is a replacement name); Trophonopsis inermis sensu Kuroda & Habe, 1952

Species of gastropod

Dermomurex infrons is a species of sea snail, a marine gastropod mollusk in the family Muricidae, the murex snails or rock snails.

== Description ==
The shell is medium-sized for the genus and has a broad, rounded last whorl. The axial varices are rounded and the aperture is broad and rounded-ovate. The siphonal canal is relatively short, measuring approximately 25-29% of the total shell length. The intritacalx is thick, light tan to dirty white, and largely smooth, with weak spiral grooves.

The length of the shell varies between 19 mm and 47 mm.

== Distribution ==
This marine species occurs off Japan, Taiwan, the Philippines, Indonesia, and New Caledonia.
