= Dermomurex antecessor =

Scientific classification
- Kingdom: Animalia
- Phylum: Mollusca
- Class: Gastropoda
- Subclass: Caenogastropoda
- Order: Neogastropoda
- Family: Muricidae
- Genus: Dermomurex
- Species: D. antecessor

Binomial name
- Dermomurex antecessor Vokes, 1975

Synonyms
- Dermomurex (Trialatella) antecessor Vokes, 1975; Dermomurex (Trialatella) cuna Petuch, 1990

Species of gastropod

Dermomurex antecessor is a species of sea snail, a marine gastropod mollusk in the family Muricidae, the murex snails or rock snails.

== Description ==
The length of the shell varies between 10 mm and 17 mm.

== Distribution ==
This species occurs in the Caribbean Sea off Panama.
