= Dermomurex africanus =

Scientific classification
- Kingdom: Animalia
- Phylum: Mollusca
- Class: Gastropoda
- Subclass: Caenogastropoda
- Order: Neogastropoda
- Family: Muricidae
- Genus: Dermomurex
- Species: D. africanus

Binomial name
- Dermomurex africanus Vokes, 1978

Synonyms
- Dermomurex (Dermomurex) africanus Vokes, 1978

Species of gastropod

Dermomurex africanus is a species of sea snail, a marine gastropod mollusk in the family Muricidae, the murex snails or rock snails.

== Description ==
The shell grows to a length of 16 mm.

== Distribution ==
This species is found in the Indian Ocean along Mozambique and South Africa.
