= Dermomurex pasi =

Scientific classification
- Kingdom: Animalia
- Phylum: Mollusca
- Class: Gastropoda
- Subclass: Caenogastropoda
- Order: Neogastropoda
- Family: Muricidae
- Genus: Dermomurex
- Species: D. pasi

Binomial name
- Dermomurex pasi Vokes, 1993

Synonyms
- Dermomurex (Viator) pasi Vokes, 1993

Species of gastropod

Dermomurex pasi is a species of sea snail, a marine gastropod mollusk in the family Muricidae, the murex snails or rock snails.

== Description ==
The shell grows to a length of 18 mm.

== Distribution ==
This marine species occurs off Northwest Australia.
