= Dermomurex worsfoldi =

Scientific classification
- Kingdom: Animalia
- Phylum: Mollusca
- Class: Gastropoda
- Subclass: Caenogastropoda
- Order: Neogastropoda
- Family: Muricidae
- Genus: Dermomurex
- Species: D. worsfoldi

Binomial name
- Dermomurex worsfoldi Vokes, 1992

Synonyms
- Dermomurex (Dermomurex) worsfoldi Vokes, 1992

Species of gastropod

Dermomurex worsfoldi is a species of sea snail, a marine gastropod mollusk in the family Muricidae, the murex snails or rock snails.

== Description ==
The shell grows to a length of 13 mm.

== Distribution ==
This species occurs in the Atlantic Ocean off the Bahamas.
