= Dermomurex bobyini =

Scientific classification
- Kingdom: Animalia
- Phylum: Mollusca
- Class: Gastropoda
- Subclass: Caenogastropoda
- Order: Neogastropoda
- Family: Muricidae
- Genus: Dermomurex
- Species: D. bobyini

Binomial name
- Dermomurex bobyini (Kosuge, 1984)

Synonyms
- Dermomurex (Takia) bobyini (Kosuge, 1984); Takia bobyini Kosuge, 1984 (basionym)

Species of gastropod

Dermomurex bobyini is a species of sea snail, a marine gastropod mollusk in the family Muricidae, the murex snails or rock snails.

== Description ==
The length of the shell varies between 20 mm and 46 mm.

== Distribution ==
This marine species occurs off the Philippines.
