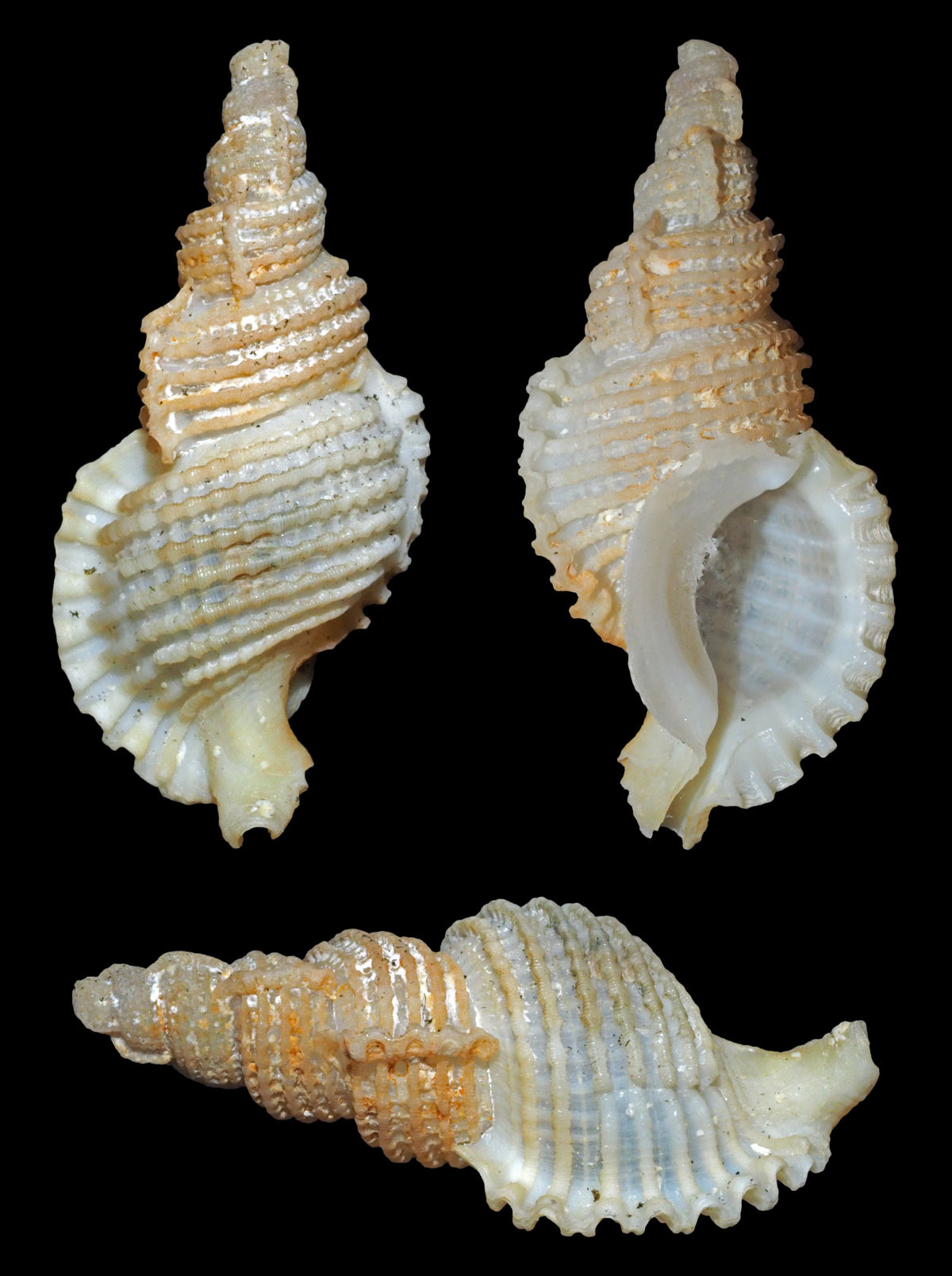
- Phyllocoma scalariformis in Mexico

Scientific classification
- Kingdom: Animalia
- Phylum: Mollusca
- Class: Gastropoda
- Subclass: Caenogastropoda
- Order: Neogastropoda
- Family: Muricidae
- Genus: Phyllocoma
- Species: P. scalariformis

Binomial name
- Phyllocoma scalariformis (Broderip, 1833)

Synonyms
- Triton scalariformis Broderip, 1833

= Phyllocoma scalariformis =

Species of gastropod

Phyllocoma scalariformis is a species of sea snail, a marine gastropod mollusc in the family Muricidae, the murex snails or rock snails.
