= Phyllocoma convoluta =

Scientific classification
- Kingdom: Animalia
- Phylum: Mollusca
- Class: Gastropoda
- Subclass: Caenogastropoda
- Order: Neogastropoda
- Family: Muricidae
- Genus: Phyllocoma
- Species: P. convoluta

Binomial name
- Phyllocoma convoluta (Broderip, 1833)

Synonyms
- Triton convolutus Broderip, 1833

Species of gastropod

Phyllocoma convoluta is a species of sea snail, a marine gastropod mollusc in the family Muricidae, the murex snails or rock snails.
