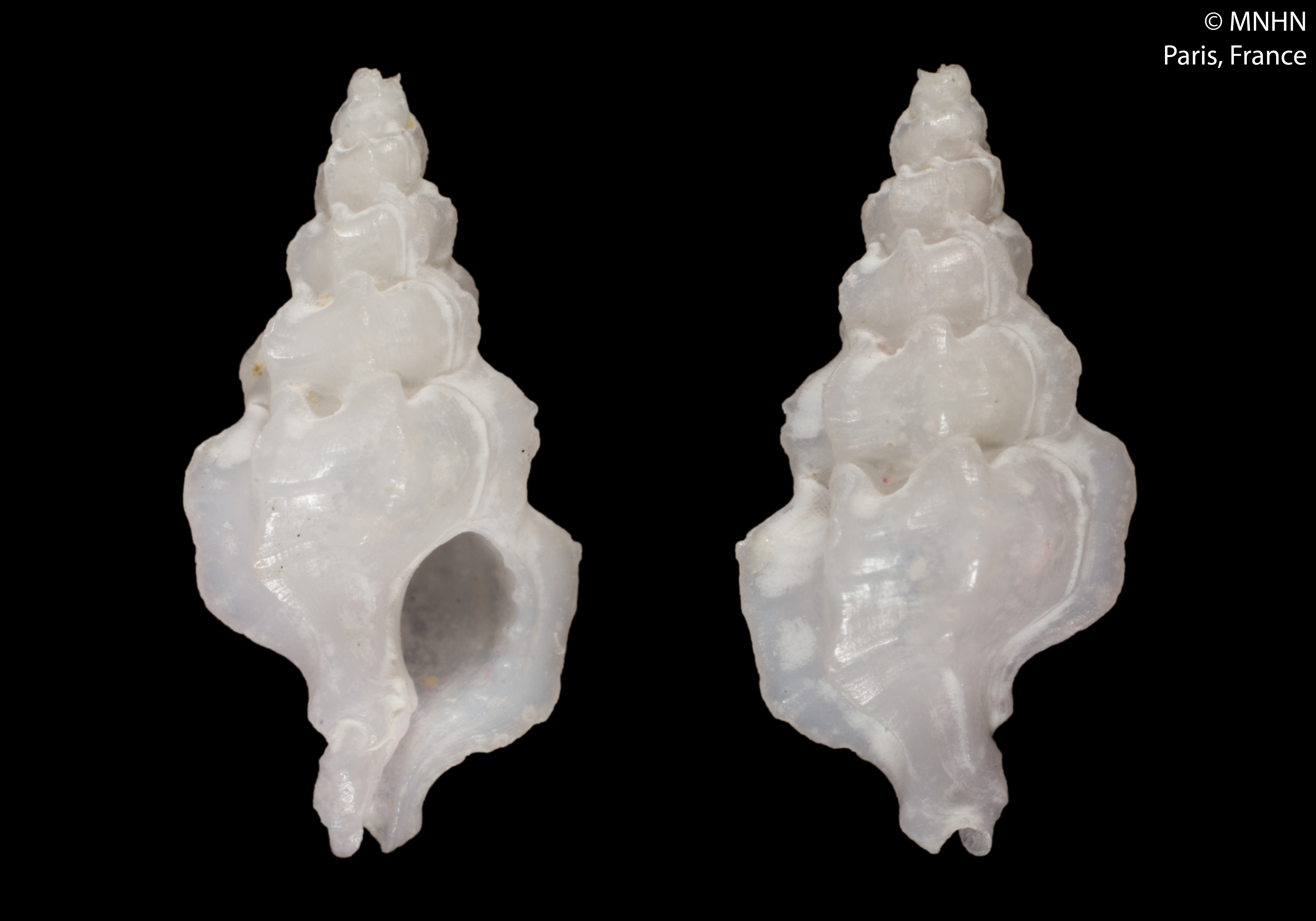
- Shell of Aspella thomassini (holotype at MNHN, Paris)

Scientific classification
- Kingdom: Animalia
- Phylum: Mollusca
- Class: Gastropoda
- Subclass: Caenogastropoda
- Order: Neogastropoda
- Family: Muricidae
- Genus: Aspella
- Species: A. thomassini

Binomial name
- Aspella thomassini Houart, 1985

= Aspella thomassini =

Species of gastropod

Aspella thomassini is a species of sea snail, a marine gastropod mollusc in the family Muricidae, the murex snails or rock snails.
