= Dermomurex angustus =

Scientific classification
- Kingdom: Animalia
- Phylum: Mollusca
- Class: Gastropoda
- Subclass: Caenogastropoda
- Order: Neogastropoda
- Family: Muricidae
- Genus: Dermomurex
- Species: D. angustus

Binomial name
- Dermomurex angustus (Verco, 1895)

Synonyms
- Dermomurex (Takia) angustus (Verco, 1895); Trophon angustus Verco, 1895 (basionym)

Species of gastropod

Dermomurex angustus is a species of sea snail, a marine gastropod mollusk in the family Muricidae, the murex snails or rock snails.

== Description ==
The shell grows to a length of 13 mm.

== Distribution ==
This marine species occurs along South and West Australia.
