= Dermomurex scalaroides =

Scientific classification
- Kingdom: Animalia
- Phylum: Mollusca
- Class: Gastropoda
- Subclass: Caenogastropoda
- Order: Neogastropoda
- Family: Muricidae
- Genus: Dermomurex
- Species: D. scalaroides

Binomial name
- Dermomurex scalaroides (Blainville, 1829)

Synonyms
- Dermomurex (Dermomurex) scalaroides (Blainville, 1829); Murex distinctus Cristofori & Jan 1832; Murex leucoderma Scacchi, 1836; Murex scalariformis Locard, 1886; Murex scalarinus Bivona-Bernardi, 1832; Murex scalaroides Blainville, 1829; Ocenebra (Takia) distinctus Settepassi, 1970; Ocenebra (Takia) distinctus elatus Settepassi, 1970; Ocenebra (Takia) distinctus elongatus Settepassi, 1970; Ocenebra (Takia) minutissimus Settepassi, 1970; Ocenebra (Takia) obesus Settepassi, 1970; Ocenebra (Takia) siculus Settepassi, 1970

Species of gastropod

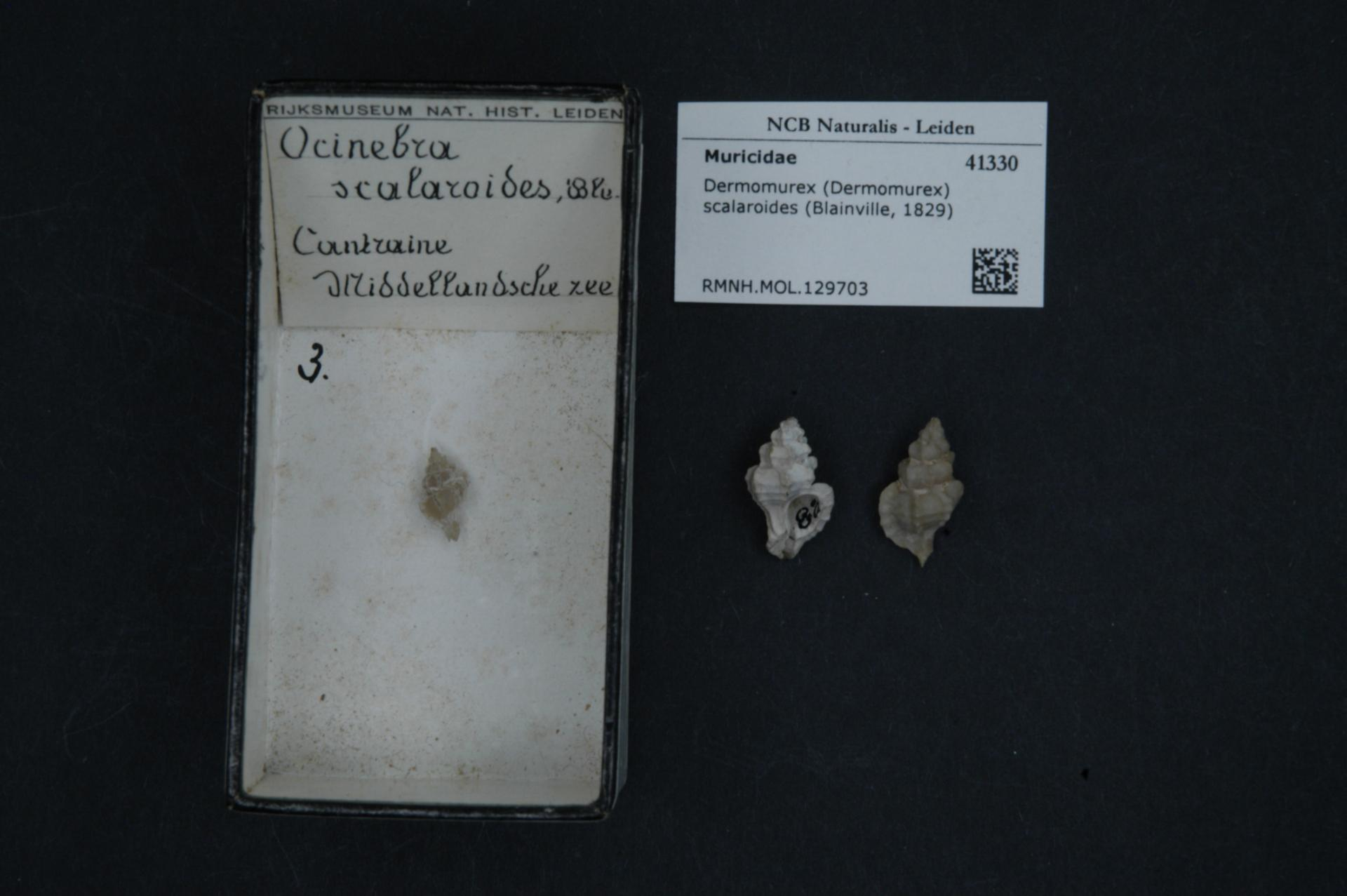
Dermomurex scalaroides

Dermomurex scalaroides is a species of sea snail, a marine gastropod mollusk in the family Muricidae, the murex snails or rock snails.

== Description ==
The length of the shell varies between 6 mm and 21 mm.

== Distribution ==
This marine species occurs in the Mediterranean Sea, in the Atlantic Ocean off West Africa and the Canary Islands.
