= Aspella anceps =

Scientific classification
- Kingdom: Animalia
- Phylum: Mollusca
- Class: Gastropoda
- Subclass: Caenogastropoda
- Order: Neogastropoda
- Family: Muricidae
- Genus: Aspella
- Species: A. anceps

Binomial name
- Aspella anceps (Lamarck, 1822)

Synonyms
- Epidromus gladiolus Monterosato, 1880; Ranella anceps Lamarck, 1822

Species of gastropod

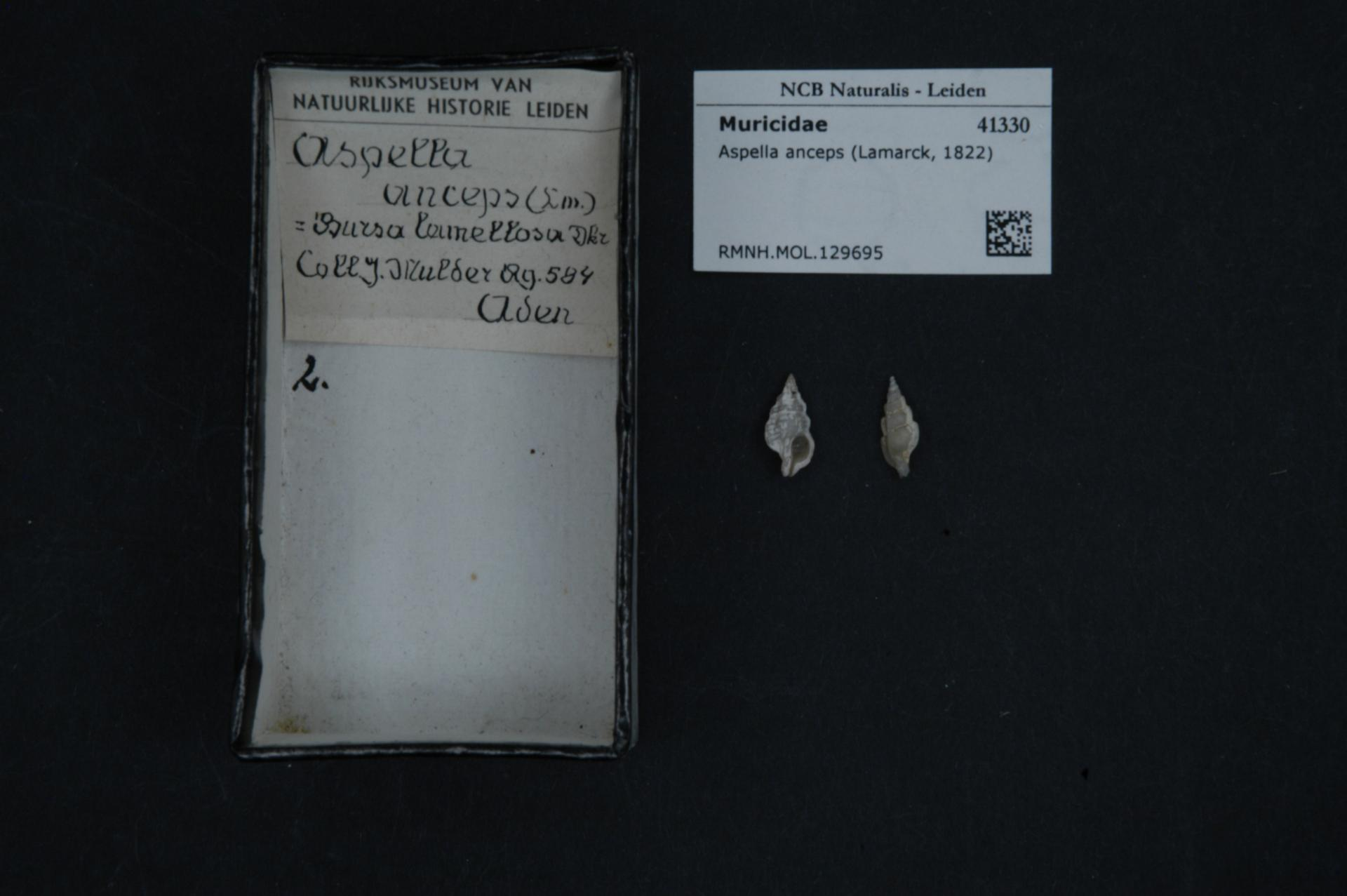
Aspella anceps

Aspella anceps is a species of sea snail, a marine gastropod mollusc in the family Muricidae, the murex snails or rock snails.
