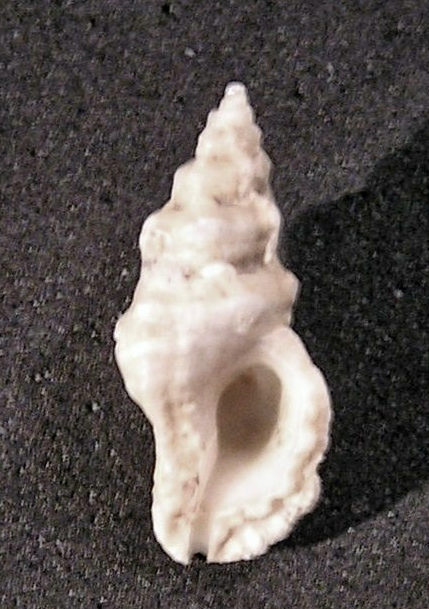
- Apertural view of a shell of Dermomurex elizabethae

Scientific classification
- Kingdom: Animalia
- Phylum: Mollusca
- Class: Gastropoda
- Subclass: Caenogastropoda
- Order: Neogastropoda
- Superfamily: Muricoidea
- Family: Muricidae
- Subfamily: Aspellinae
- Genus: Dermomurex; Monterosato, 1890

Type species
- Murex scalarinus Bivona-Bernardi, 1832

Species
- See text

Synonyms
- Aspella (Dermomurex); Dermomurex (Dermomurex) Monterosato, 1890; Dermomurex (Gracilimurex) Thiele, 1929; Dermomurex (Takia) Kuroda, 1953; Dermomurex (Trialatella) Berry, 1964; Dermomurex (Viator) E.H. Vokes, 1974; † Hexachorda Cossmann, 1903; Murex (Gracilimurex) Thiele, 1929 (original rank); Ocenebra (Takia) Kuroda, 1953; Poweria Monterosato, 1884 (Invalid: junior homonym of Poweria Bonaparte, 1840 [Pisces]; Dermomurex is a replacement name); Takia Kuroda, 1953 (original rank); Trialatella Berry, 1964

= Dermomurex =

Genus of gastropods

Dermomurex is a genus of sea snails, marine gastropod mollusks in the family Muricidae, the murex snails or rock snails.

== Species ==
Species within the genus Dermomurex include:

- Dermomurex abyssicolus (Crosse, 1865)
- Dermomurex africanus Vokes, 1978
- Dermomurex agnesae Vokes, 1995
- Dermomurex alabastrum (A. Adams, 1864)
- Dermomurex angustus (Verco, 1895)
- Dermomurex antecessor Vokes, 1975
- Dermomurex antonius Vokes, 1974
- Dermomurex bakeri (Hertlein & Strong, 1951)
- † Dermomurex bathyrhaphe Lozouet, 1999
- † Dermomurex bezoyensis Lozouet, 1999
- Dermomurex binghamae Vokes, 1992
- Dermomurex bobyini (Kosuge, 1984)
- Dermomurex boucheti Garrigues & Merle, 2014
- Dermomurex charlesi Houart & Héros, 2013
- Dermomurex colombi Houart, 2006
- Dermomurex coonsorum Petuch, 2013
- Dermomurex cunninghamae (Berry, 1964)
- † Dermomurex distinctus (Cristofori & Jan, 1832)
- Dermomurex elizabethae (McGinty, 1940)
- Dermomurex fajouensis Garrigues & Merle, 2014
- Dermomurex fitialeatai Houart, 2015
- Dermomurex glicksteini Petuch, 1987
- Dermomurex gofasi Houart, 1996
- Dermomurex goldsteini Tenison Woods, 1876
- Dermomurex gunteri Vokes, 1985
- Dermomurex gutta Garrigues & Lamy, 2019
- Dermomurex howletti Vokes, 1995
- Dermomurex indentatus (Carpenter, 1857)
- Dermomurex infrons Vokes, 1974
- Dermomurex kaicherae (Petuch, 1987)
- Dermomurex lanceolatus Garrigues & Lamy, 2019
- Dermomurex leali Houart, 1991
- Dermomurex manonae Houart, Héros & Zuccon, 2019
- Dermomurex myrakeenae (Emerson & D'Attilio, 1970)
- Dermomurex neglectus (Habe & Kosuge, 1971)
- † Dermomurex nemethi Z. Kovács, 2018
- Dermomurex obeliscus (A. Adams, 1853)
- Dermomurex olssoni Vokes, 1989
- Dermomurex oxum Petuch, 1979
- Dermomurex pacei Petuch, 1988
- Dermomurex pasi Vokes, 1993
- Dermomurex paulinae Houart, Héros & Zuccon, 2019
- Dermomurex pauperculus (C. B. Adams, 1850)
- Dermomurex pruvosti Garrigues & Merle, 2014
- Dermomurex raywalkeri Houart, 1986
- Dermomurex sarasuae Vokes, 1992
- Dermomurex scalaroides (Blainville, 1829)
- Dermomurex sepositus Houart, 1993
- † Dermomurex silicatus Darragh, 2017
- Dermomurex spinosus Garrigues & Lamy, 2017
- Dermomurex tararensis Garrigues & Merle, 2014
- † Dermomurex tenellus (Mayer, 1869)
- Dermomurex triclotae Houart, 2001
- Dermomurex trivaricosus Houart, Gori & Rosado, 2017
- Dermomurex trondleorum Houart, 1990
- Dermomurex wareni Houart, 1990
- Dermomurex worsfoldi Vokes, 1992
