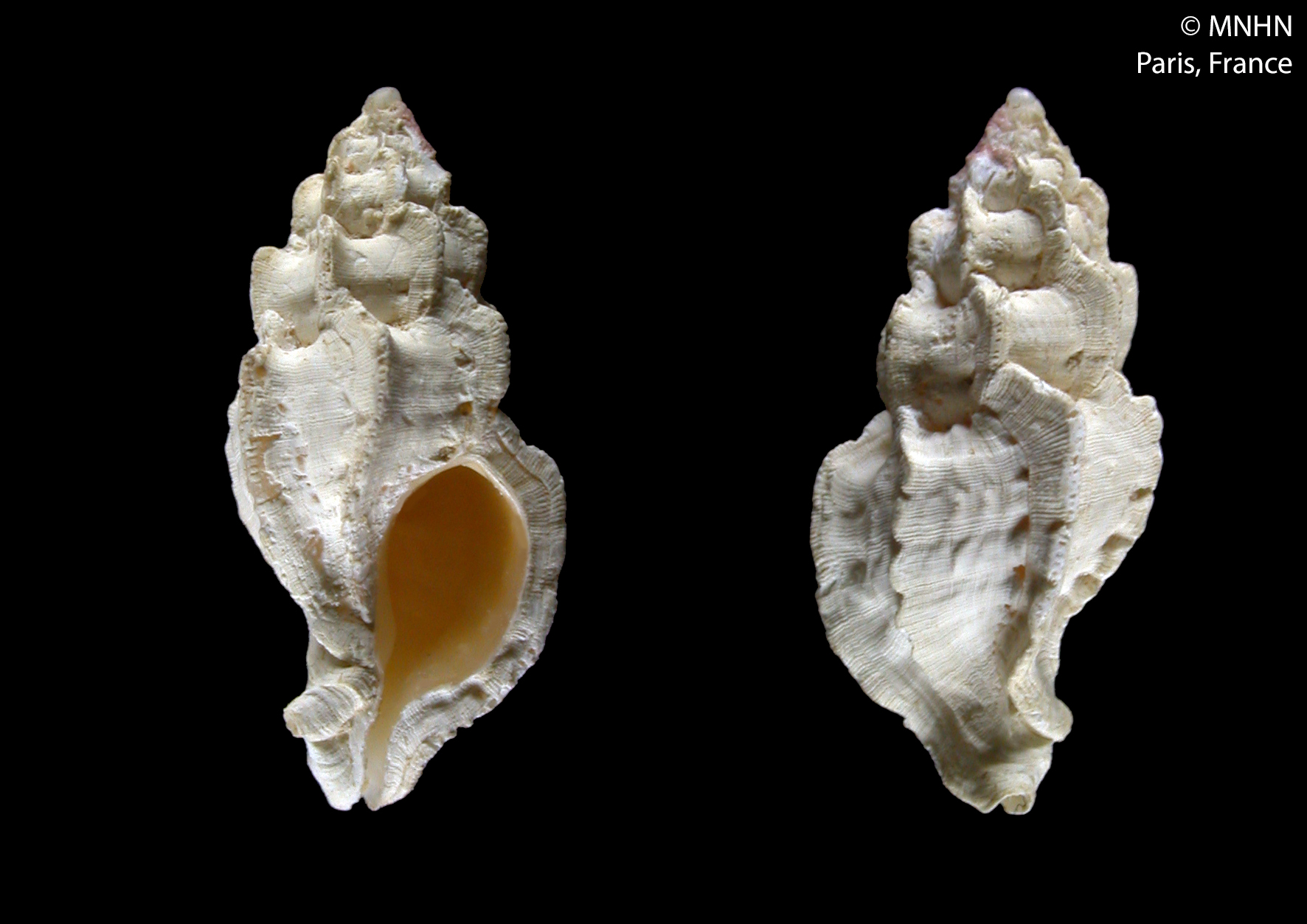

Scientific classification
- Kingdom: Animalia
- Phylum: Mollusca
- Class: Gastropoda
- Subclass: Caenogastropoda
- Order: Neogastropoda
- Family: Muricidae
- Genus: Dermomurex
- Species: D. colombi

Binomial name
- Dermomurex colombi Houart, 2006

Synonyms
- Dermomurex (Dermomurex) colombi Houart, 2006

= Dermomurex colombi =

Species of gastropod

Dermomurex colombi is a species of sea snail, a marine gastropod mollusc in the family Muricidae, the murex snails or rock snails.

== Description ==
The length of the shell varies between 8 mm and 13 mm.

== Distribution ==
This marine species occurs off Martinique and the Lesser Antilles.
