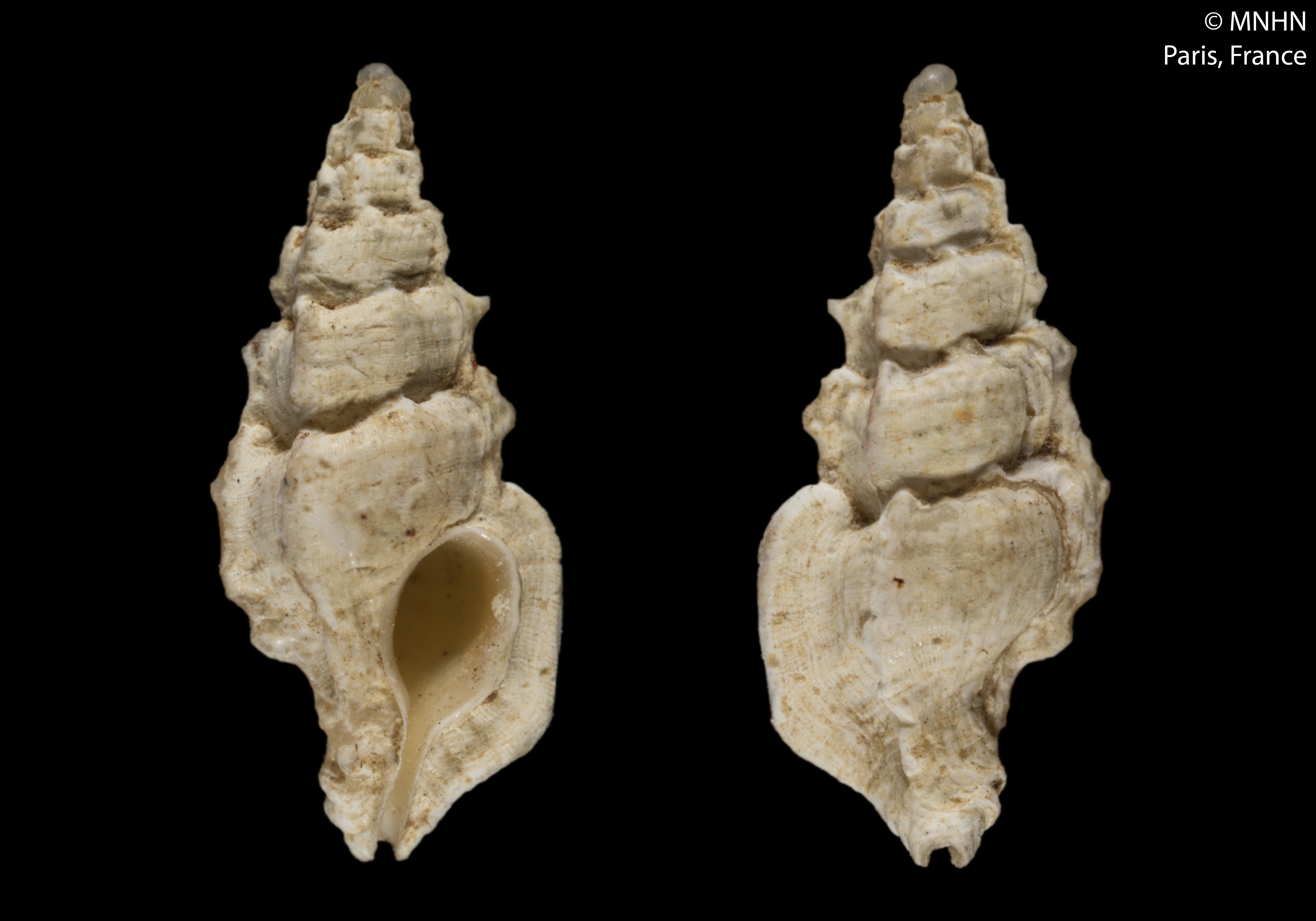
- Shell of Aspella helenae (holotype at MNHN, Paris)

Scientific classification
- Kingdom: Animalia
- Phylum: Mollusca
- Class: Gastropoda
- Subclass: Caenogastropoda
- Order: Neogastropoda
- Family: Muricidae
- Genus: Aspella
- Species: A. helenae

Binomial name
- Aspella helenae Houart & Tröndlé, 2008

= Aspella helenae =

Species of gastropod

Aspella helenae is a species of sea snail, a marine gastropod mollusc in the family Muricidae, the murex snails or rock snails.
