= Dermomurex sepositus =

Scientific classification
- Kingdom: Animalia
- Phylum: Mollusca
- Class: Gastropoda
- Subclass: Caenogastropoda
- Order: Neogastropoda
- Family: Muricidae
- Genus: Dermomurex
- Species: D. sepositus

Binomial name
- Dermomurex sepositus Houart, 1993

Synonyms
- Dermomurex (Trialatella) sepositus Houart, 1993

Species of gastropod

Dermomurex sepositus is a species of sea snail, a marine gastropod mollusk in the family Muricidae, the murex snails or rock snails.

== Description ==
The length of the shell attains 9 mm.

== Distribution ==
This species occurs in the Atlantic Ocean off Cameroon.
