= Dermomurex cunninghamae =

Scientific classification
- Kingdom: Animalia
- Phylum: Mollusca
- Class: Gastropoda
- Subclass: Caenogastropoda
- Order: Neogastropoda
- Family: Muricidae
- Genus: Dermomurex
- Species: D. cunninghamae

Binomial name
- Dermomurex cunninghamae (Berry, 1964)

Synonyms
- Dermomurex (Trialatella) cunninghamae (Berry, 1964); Trialatella cunninghamae Berry, 1964 (basionym)

Species of gastropod

Dermomurex cunninghamae is a species of sea snail, a marine gastropod mollusk in the family Muricidae, the murex snails or rock snails.

== Description ==
The shell has a maximum length of 18.5mm. The spire is high and acute, consisting of two and a half tightly wound, convex nuclear whorls and five postnuclear whorls.

== Distribution ==
This species occurs in the Pacific Ocean from Mexico to Panama.
