= Harold Vokes =

American paleontologist

Ernest Harold Vokes
- Born: June 27, 1908; Windsor, Ontario, Canada
- Died: September 16, 1998 (aged 90); Hammond, Louisiana
- Education: Occidental College, University of California, Berkeley
- Scientific career
- Fields: Malacology, Paleontology
- Workplaces: Johns Hopkins University, Tulane University (retired 1978)

Harold Ernest Vokes (June 27, 1908 — September 16, 1998), was an American malacologist and paleontologist. He specialized in bivalves, especially fossils found along the Gulf Coast and Atlantic Coast, and he taught at Johns Hopkins and Tulane universities. He often collaborated with his wife, the malacologist Emily H. Vokes.

== Education and early career ==
Harold Ernest Vokes was born in Windsor, Ontario, Canada, but when he was 12 the family moved to Pasadena, California. He attended Occidental College, initially majoring in English but along the way becoming fascinated with geology. He received his B.S. in 1931 with a major in geology and a minor in biology. He did his graduate work with paleontologist Bruce Clark at the University of California, Berkeley, where he got his Ph.D. in paleontology in 1935 with a dissertation on fossil mollusks of the Middle Eocene.

Vokes took a postdoctoral fellowship at the Peabody Museum of Natural History at Yale University, where he worked with Carl Owen Dunbar. With Dunbar's recommendation, in 1937, he became assistant curator and in 1941 associate curator of invertebrate paleontology at the American Museum of Natural History in New York City. In 1940, a Guggenheim Fellowship allowed him to study the geology and paleontology of the mountain regions of Lebanon, and especially the mollusks found in chalk strata.

In 1943, during World War II, Vokes joined the United States Geological Survey (USGS) to search for uranium. He continued working intermittently for the USGS after the war until 1956, mapping the coast of Oregon and searching for oil under the Columbia Plateau.

== Academic career ==
In 1946 he joined the faculty of Johns Hopkins University as associate professor and was promoted to professor of geology the following year. In 1956, he moved to Tulane University. Shortly after arriving, he met Emily Hoskins, then a geology student at Tulane University and later a malacologist of note. They married in 1959 and collaborated frequently on scientific research thereafter.

At Tulane, Vokes was tasked with rebuilding the Geology Department, and within a few years, he had doubled the number of faculty and added a graduate program. He served as chair from 1957 to 1966, and in 1972 he was named the W. R. Irby Professor of Geology. He founded the journal Tulane Studies in Geology and Paleontology, which published on the fauna of the western Atlantic. He stayed at Tulane until he was forced to retire in 1978, when he reached the then-limiting age of 70. He continued his field researches well into his 80s, however.

Over the course of his career, Vokes worked on Eocene marine fossils, freshwater bivalves, and Cretaceous mollusks, among other things. He published over 130 scientific publications, most notably his 1967 Genera of the Bivalvia. He named over 29 genera and 200 species of invertebrates. His researches took him to the Indian Ocean (1964), the Caribbean (1965), Panama and Costa Rica (1968), the Dominican Republic (1976–86), Europe (1984), and much of South America (Argentina, Brazil, Chile, Peru, Ecuador). In 1971, he was a visiting professor at the University of Rio Grande do Sul in Brazil.

He served as vice-president and then president (1951) of the Paleontological Society; as secretary (1940–49) and vice-president (1952) of the Geological Society of America; and as president of the Paleontological Research Institute (1974–76). He was a member of the International Commission of Zoological Nomenclature from 1974 to 1978.

Vokes and his wife helped to start a summer field-work camp in Mexico, and for over a decade they traveled annually to the Yucatán Peninsula to study mollusks, resulting in their book Distribution of Shallow-Water Marine Mollusca, Yucatan Peninsula, Mexico (1983).

Vokes and his wife were the core of the paleontological research program at Tulane University, and their fossil collections were extensive. These collections included research findings from excursions to the southeastern United States, Mexico, the Dominican Republic, and Europe. A number of their specimens have been transferred to the Smithsonian, the University of Florida, and the Paleontological Research Institution.

In retirement, Vokes lived in Ponchatoula, Louisiana. He died in Hammond, Louisiana, on September 16, 1998, survived by his wife.

== Selected works ==
- "Molluscan faunas of the Domengine and Arroyo Hondo formations of the California Eocene." Annals of the New York Academy of Sciences 38 (no. 1) (1939): 1–246.
- "Supraspecific groups of the pelecypod family Corbulidae". Bulletin of the AMNH, v. 86, article 1 (1945).
- "Contributions to the paleontology of the Lebanon Mountains, Republic of Lebanon. Part 3, The pelecypod fauna of the 'Olive Locality'(Aptian) at Abeih". Bulletin of the AMNH, v. 87, article 3 (1946).
- Lower Tertiary crinoids from northwestern Oregon. USGS publication no. 233-E (1953). (With R. C. Moore).
- Genera of the Bivalvia: a systematic and bibliographic catalogue (revised and updated). Bulls. Amer. Paleo., v. 51 (no. 232) (1967); revised in 1980.
- Neogene Paleontology in the Northern Dominican Republic: The Family Cardiidae (Mollusca: Bivalvia). Bulls. Amer. Paleo., v. 97 (no. 322 (1989).

== Awards and legacy ==
Tulane University established the Harold E. Vokes Award, given to outstanding geology students. In 2014, it also established the title Vokes Geology Professor, awarded in honor of both Harold and Emily Vokes.

The Drs. Emily H. and Harold E. Vokes Grants-in-Aid for Invertebrate Paleontology Collection-Based Research are given to advanced undergraduate students from anywhere in the United States who wish to use the collections at the Florida Museum of Natural History for paleobiological research.
