= Aspella hastula =

Scientific classification
- Kingdom: Animalia
- Phylum: Mollusca
- Class: Gastropoda
- Subclass: Caenogastropoda
- Order: Neogastropoda
- Family: Muricidae
- Genus: Aspella
- Species: A. hastula

Binomial name
- Aspella hastula (Reeve, 1844)

Synonyms
- Ranella hastula Reeve, 1844

Species of gastropod

Aspella hastula is a species of sea snail, a marine gastropod mollusc in the family Muricidae, the murex snails or rock snails.
