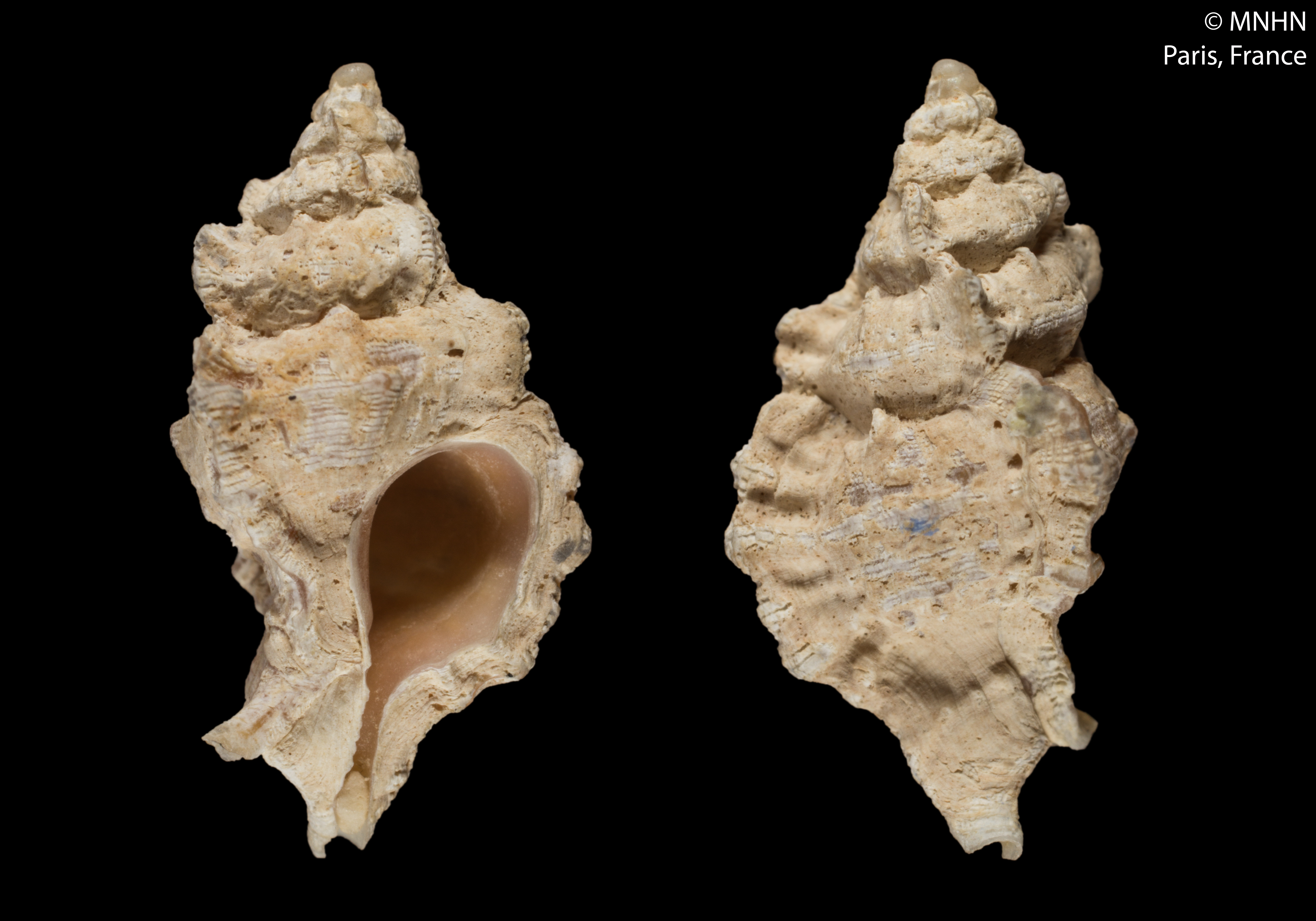

Scientific classification
- Kingdom: Animalia
- Phylum: Mollusca
- Class: Gastropoda
- Subclass: Caenogastropoda
- Order: Neogastropoda
- Family: Muricidae
- Genus: Dermomurex
- Species: D. triclotae

Binomial name
- Dermomurex triclotae Houart, 2001

Synonyms
- Dermomurex (Trialatella) triclotae Houart, 2001

= Dermomurex triclotae =

Species of gastropod

Dermomurex triclotae is a species of sea snail, a marine gastropod mollusk in the family Muricidae, the murex snails or rock snails.

== Description ==
The shell grows to a length of 13 mm.

== Distribution ==
This marine species occurs off New Caledonia.

== Habitat ==
The snail generally can be found on rocky substrates in shallow water.
