= Dermomurex indentatus =

Scientific classification
- Kingdom: Animalia
- Phylum: Mollusca
- Class: Gastropoda
- Subclass: Caenogastropoda
- Order: Neogastropoda
- Family: Muricidae
- Genus: Dermomurex
- Species: D. indentatus

Binomial name
- Dermomurex indentatus (Carpenter, 1857)

Synonyms
- Aspella (Dermomurex) perplexa Keen, 1958; Muricidea erinaceoides var. indentatus Carpenter, 1857 (basionym)

Species of gastropod

Dermomurex indentatus is a species of sea snail, a marine gastropod mollusk in the family Muricidae, the murex snails or rock snails.

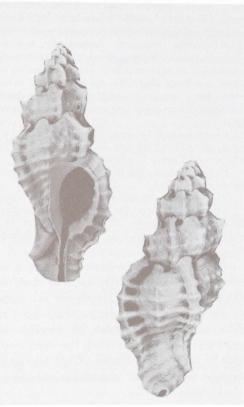
Illustration of Dermomurex indentatus

== Description ==
The length of the shell varies between 25 mm and 33 mm.

== Distribution ==
This species occurs in the Pacific Ocean from Mexico to Panama.
