= Dermomurex goldsteini =

Scientific classification
- Kingdom: Animalia
- Phylum: Mollusca
- Class: Gastropoda
- Subclass: Caenogastropoda
- Order: Neogastropoda
- Family: Muricidae
- Genus: Dermomurex
- Species: D. goldsteini

Binomial name
- Dermomurex goldsteini Tenison Woods, 1876

Synonyms
- Dermomurex (Dermomurex) goldsteini Tenison Woods, 1876; Trophon goldsteini Tenison Woods, 1876

Species of gastropod

Dermomurex goldsteini, common name Goldstein's trophon, is a species of sea snail, a marine gastropod mollusk in the family Muricidae, the murex snails or rock snails.

== Description ==
The length of the shell varies between 8 mm and 21 mm.

== Distribution ==
This marine species occurs off southern New South Wales, southwest Western Australia, and Tasmania.
