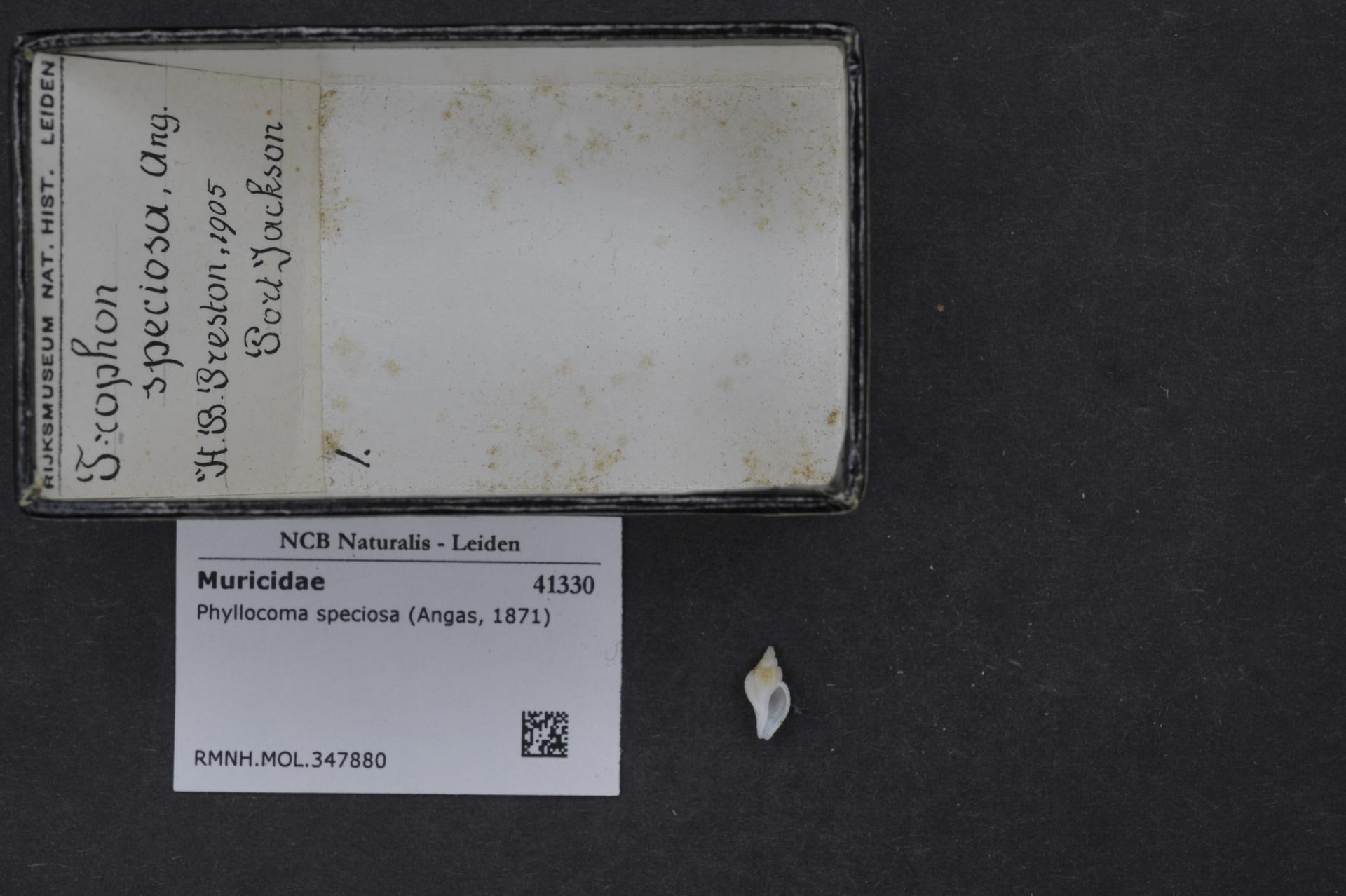

Scientific classification
- Kingdom: Animalia
- Phylum: Mollusca
- Class: Gastropoda
- Subclass: Caenogastropoda
- Order: Neogastropoda
- Family: Muricidae
- Genus: Phyllocoma
- Species: P. speciosa

Binomial name
- Phyllocoma speciosa (Angas, 1871)

Synonyms
- Galfridus speciosus (Angas, 1871); Galfridus speciosus speciosus (Angas, 1871); Murex scalarinus A. Adams, 1864; Phyllocoma (Galfridus) speciosa (Angas, 1871)· accepted, alternate representation; Phyllocoma (Galfridus) speciosa speciosa (Angas, 1871)· accepted, alternate representation; Triton (Cumia) speciosus Angas, 1871 (basionym); Triton speciosus Angas, 1871 (original combination)

= Phyllocoma speciosa =

Species of gastropod

Phyllocoma speciosa is a species of sea snail, a marine gastropod mollusk in the family Muricidae, the murex snails or rock snails.

== Subspecies ==
- Phyllocoma speciosa eburnea (Petterd, 1884)
- Phyllocoma speciosa speciosa (Angas, 1871)
- Phyllocoma speciosa virginalis (Suter, 1913)

== Description ==
The shell size is between 12 mm and 20 mm.

== Distribution ==
This species occurs in Australian waters along Queensland and New South Wales, Victoria and Tasmania, and along New Zealand.
