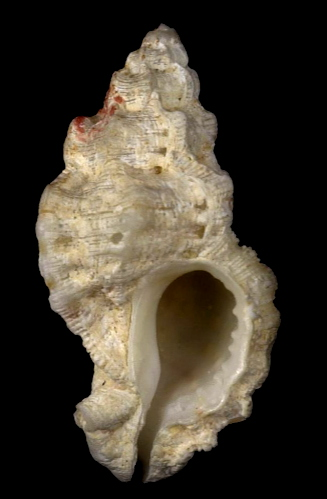
- Shell of Dermomurex kaicherae (specimen at the Smithsonian Institution)

Scientific classification
- Kingdom: Animalia
- Phylum: Mollusca
- Class: Gastropoda
- Subclass: Caenogastropoda
- Order: Neogastropoda
- Family: Muricidae
- Genus: Dermomurex
- Species: D. kaicherae

Binomial name
- Dermomurex kaicherae (Petuch, 1987)

Synonyms
- Dermomurex (Dermomurex) kaicherae Petuch, 1987; Dermomurex (Trialatella) kaicherae Petuch, 1987

= Dermomurex kaicherae =

Species of gastropod

Dermomurex kaicherae is a species of sea snail, a marine gastropod mollusk in the family Muricidae, the murex snails or rock snails.

== Description ==
Original description: "Shell elongated, fusiform, thin and fragile; 3 thin, winglike varices per whorl; body whorl and spire whorls ornamented with 3 large, evenly-spaced spiral cords; intervarical regions with an axial rib composed of 3 large knobs; 3 large cords extend onto backs of winglike varices; entire shell covered with numerous fine spiral threads, giving shell a rough appearance; aperture large, oval, with 6 tiny red denticles along inner edge of lip; entire shell uniform chocolate-brown; interior of aperture brown; columella tan; intritacalx (eroded off much of holotype) tan."

The length of the shell varies between 13 mm and 23 mm.

== Distribution ==
Locus typicus: "Off Cabo La Vela, Goajira Peninsula, Colombia."

This species occurs in the Caribbean Sea (off Colombia)

and the Lesser Antilles (off the Virgin Islands, St. Croix and Tortola)
