= Dermomurex leali =

Scientific classification
- Kingdom: Animalia
- Phylum: Mollusca
- Class: Gastropoda
- Subclass: Caenogastropoda
- Order: Neogastropoda
- Family: Muricidae
- Genus: Dermomurex
- Species: D. leali

Binomial name
- Dermomurex leali Houart, 1991

Synonyms
- Dermomurex (Trialatella) leali Houart, 1991

Species of gastropod

Dermomurex leali is a species of sea snail, a marine gastropod mollusk in the family 'Muricidae', the murex snails or rock snails.

== Description ==
The length of the shell varies between 7 mm and 10 mm.

Its functional group is Benthos.

Its feeding type is predatory.

== Distribution ==
This species occurs in the Atlantic Ocean off Eastern Brazil.
