= Aspella producta =

Scientific classification
- Kingdom: Animalia
- Phylum: Mollusca
- Class: Gastropoda
- Subclass: Caenogastropoda
- Order: Neogastropoda
- Family: Muricidae
- Genus: Aspella
- Species: A. producta

Binomial name
- Aspella producta (Pease, 1861)

Synonyms
- Bursa lamellosa Dunker, 1863; Ranella producta Pease, 1861

Species of gastropod

Aspella producta is a species of sea snail, a marine gastropod mollusc in the family Muricidae, the murex snails or rock snails.
