= Dermomurex myrakeenae =

Scientific classification
- Kingdom: Animalia
- Phylum: Mollusca
- Class: Gastropoda
- Subclass: Caenogastropoda
- Order: Neogastropoda
- Family: Muricidae
- Genus: Dermomurex
- Species: D. myrakeenae

Binomial name
- Dermomurex myrakeenae (Emerson & D'Attilio, 1970)

Synonyms
- Aspella (Dermomurex) myrakeenae Emerson & D'Attilio, 1970; Dermomurex (Dermomurex) myrakeenae (Emerson & D'Attilio, 1970)

Species of gastropod

Dermomurex myrakeenae is a species of sea snail, a marine gastropod mollusk in the family Muricidae, the murex snails or rock snails.

== Description ==
The size of an adult shell varies between 14 mm and 25 mm. It’s shell colours stay within a strict palette of ivory, beige, white, and cream.

== Distribution ==
This species is found in the Pacific Ocean along California, Mexico and reaching south to Ecuador.
