= Dermomurex wareni =

Scientific classification
- Kingdom: Animalia
- Phylum: Mollusca
- Class: Gastropoda
- Subclass: Caenogastropoda
- Order: Neogastropoda
- Family: Muricidae
- Genus: Dermomurex
- Species: D. wareni

Binomial name
- Dermomurex wareni Houart, 1990

Synonyms
- Dermomurex (Takia) wareni Houart, 1990

Species of gastropod

Dermomurex wareni is a species of sea snail, a marine gastropod mollusk in the family Muricidae, the murex snails or rock snails.

== Description ==
The length of the shell varies between 37 mm and 57 mm.

== Distribution ==
This marine species occurs off New Caledonia.
