= Dermomurex pacei =

Scientific classification
- Kingdom: Animalia
- Phylum: Mollusca
- Class: Gastropoda
- Subclass: Caenogastropoda
- Order: Neogastropoda
- Family: Muricidae
- Genus: Dermomurex
- Species: D. pacei

Binomial name
- Dermomurex pacei Petuch, 1988

Synonyms
- Dermomurex (Dermodurex) pacei Petuch, 1988

Species of gastropod

Dermomurex pacei is a species of sea snail, a marine gastropod mollusk in the family Muricidae, the murex snails or rock snails.

== Description ==
The length of the shell varies between 15 mm and 20 mm.

== Distribution ==
This marine species occurs off Cuba, the Florida Keys, USA and the Bahamas.
