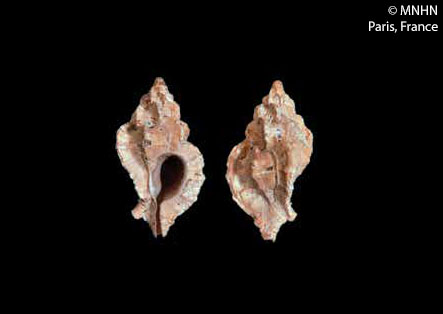
- Shell of Dermomurex oxum (specimen at MNHN, Paris)

Scientific classification
- Kingdom: Animalia
- Phylum: Mollusca
- Class: Gastropoda
- Subclass: Caenogastropoda
- Order: Neogastropoda
- Family: Muricidae
- Genus: Dermomurex
- Species: D. oxum

Binomial name
- Dermomurex oxum Petuch, 1979

Synonyms
- Dermomurex abyssicola auct. non Crosse, 1865; Dermomurex cuna auct. non Petuch, 1990; Dermomurex (Trialatella) oxum Petuch, 1979

= Dermomurex oxum =

Species of gastropod

Dermomurex oxum is a species of sea snail, a marine gastropod mollusk in the family Muricidae, the murex snails or rock snails.

== Description ==
The length of the shell varies between 8 mm and 16 mm.

== Distribution ==
This species occurs in the Caribbean Sea off Panama, French Guiana and in the Atlantic Ocean off northeast Brazil.
