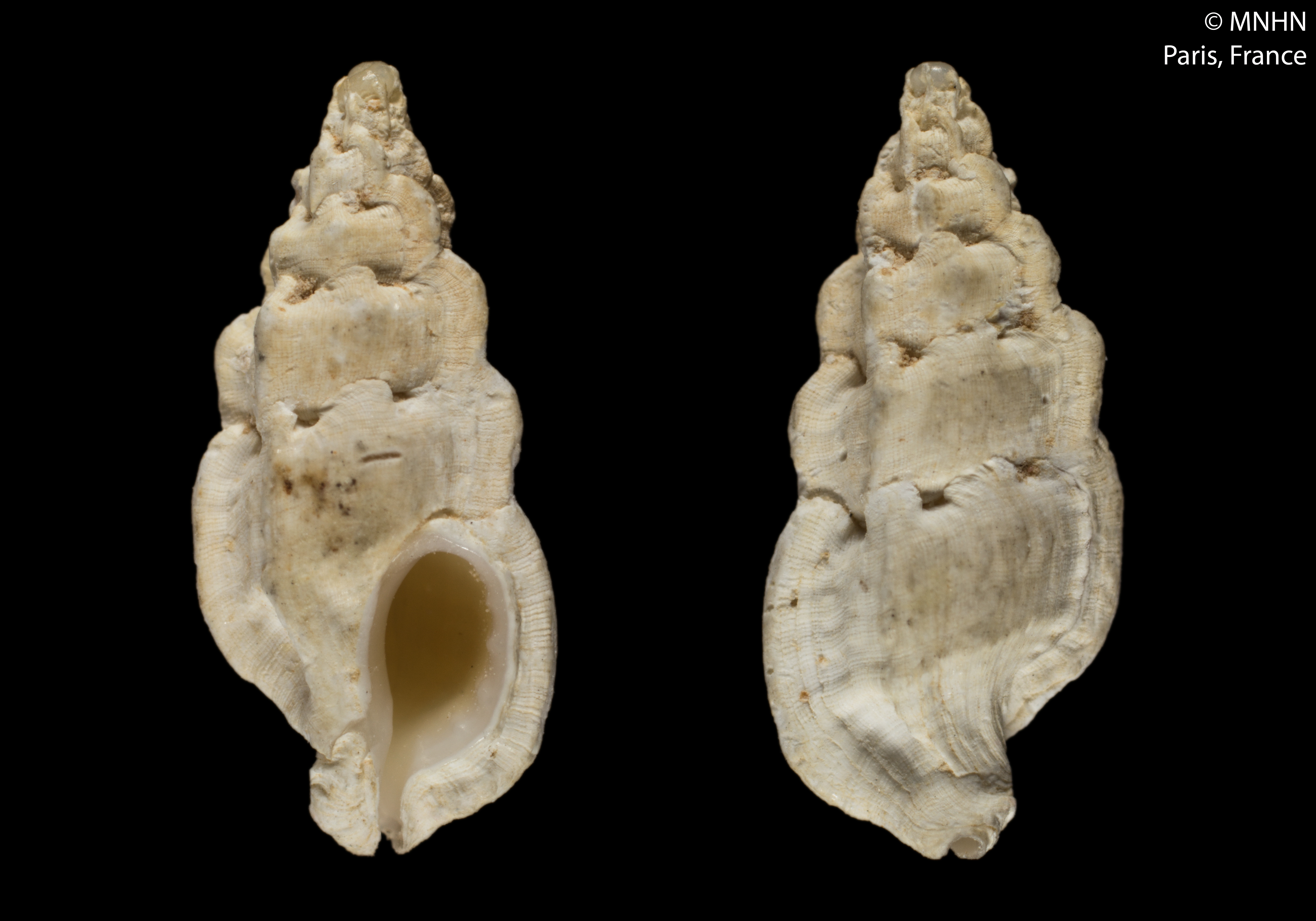
- Shell of Aspella lozoueti (holotype at MNHN, Paris)

Scientific classification
- Kingdom: Animalia
- Phylum: Mollusca
- Class: Gastropoda
- Subclass: Caenogastropoda
- Order: Neogastropoda
- Family: Muricidae
- Genus: Aspella
- Species: A. lozoueti

Binomial name
- Aspella lozoueti Houart & Tröndlé, 2008

= Aspella lozoueti =

Species of gastropod

Aspella lozoueti is a species of sea snail, a marine gastropod mollusc in the family Muricidae, the murex snails or rock snails.
