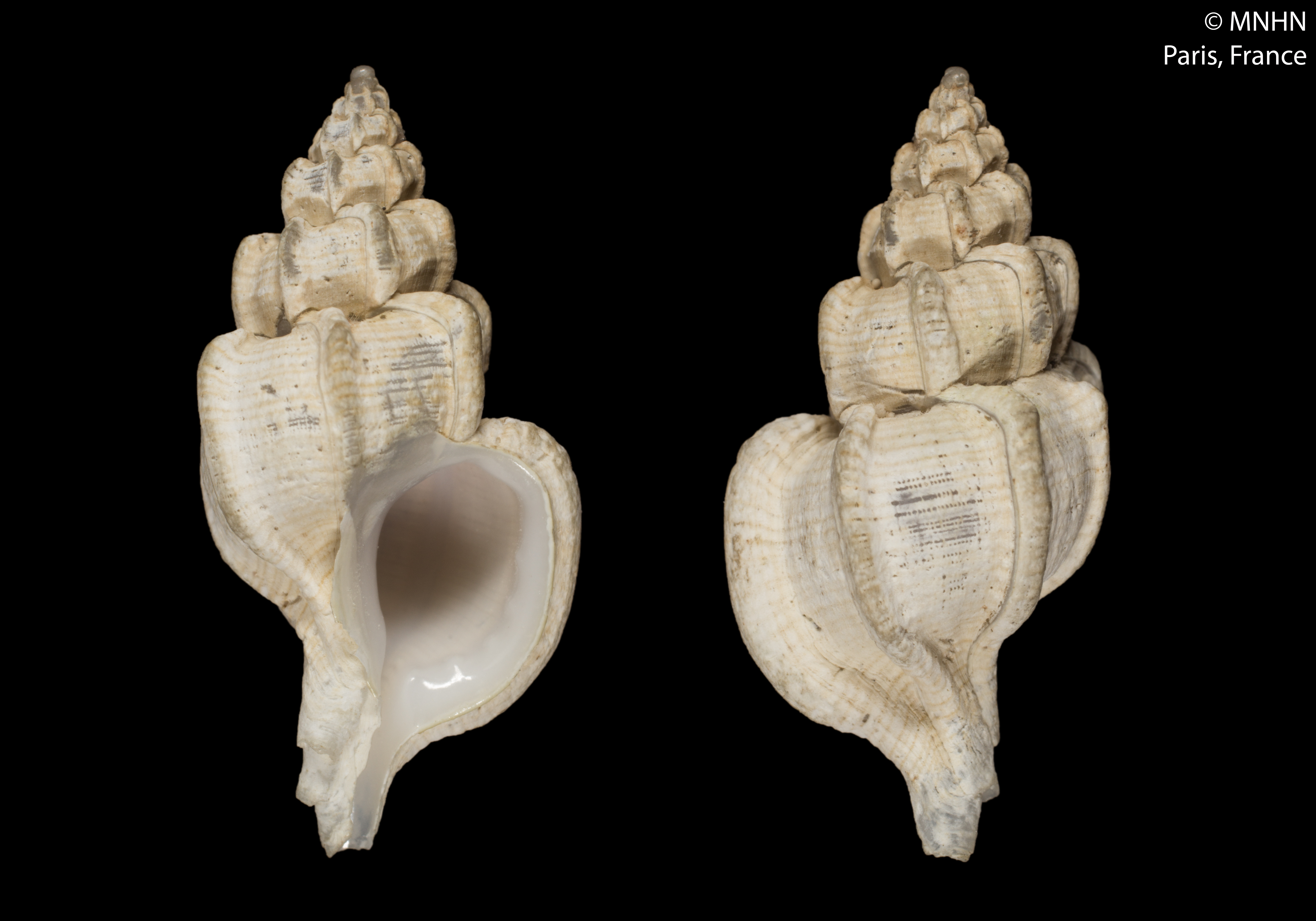

Scientific classification
- Kingdom: Animalia
- Phylum: Mollusca
- Class: Gastropoda
- Subclass: Caenogastropoda
- Order: Neogastropoda
- Family: Muricidae
- Genus: Dermomurex
- Species: D. gofasi

Binomial name
- Dermomurex gofasi Houart, 1996

Synonyms
- Dermomurex (Takia) gofasi Houart, 1996

= Dermomurex gofasi =

Species of gastropod

Dermomurex gofasi is a species of sea snail, a marine gastropod mollusk in the family Muricidae, the murex snails or rock snails.

== Description ==
The length of the shell varies between 11 mm and 19 mm. The fusiform shell has a moderately high spire and a deep suture. The globose and smooth protoconch contains 1 1/2 whorl. The teleoconch shows strong, elevated, and rounded axial varices set quite far apart from each other (about 6 on the body whorl) and flat spiral cords which overrun the varices. The external surface form an intritacalx (= the chalky outer layer) which gives it a chalky appearance, even on fresh specimens, as is characteristic of the genus. The body whorl has maximum convexity just below the deep suture. Then it is rather parallel sided at the periphery and markedly constricted around the siphonal canal. The aperture is strongly thickened externally by the last varix, with an indistinct inner rim, bearing 5 faint denticles on aged specimens. It is glossy inside in contrast with the outer intritacalx. The siphonal canal is straight and open. The colour of the shell is dirty white, with indistinct yellowish lines along the spiral cords.

== Distribution ==
This species occurs in the Northeast Atlantic Ocean.
