= Dermomurex abyssicolus =

Scientific classification
- Kingdom: Animalia
- Phylum: Mollusca
- Class: Gastropoda
- Subclass: Caenogastropoda
- Order: Neogastropoda
- Family: Muricidae
- Genus: Dermomurex
- Species: D. abyssicolus

Binomial name
- Dermomurex abyssicolus (Crosse, 1865)

Synonyms
- Dermomurex (Trialatella) abyssicola (Crosse, 1865); Murex abyssicola Crosse, 1865

Species of gastropod

Dermomurex abyssicolus is a species of sea snail, a marine gastropod mollusk in the family Muricidae, the murex snails or rock snails.

== Description ==
The length of the shell varies between 3 mm and 10 mm.

== Distribution ==
This marine species occurs off West Florida, USA; the Bahamas, Guadeloupe and Brazil.
