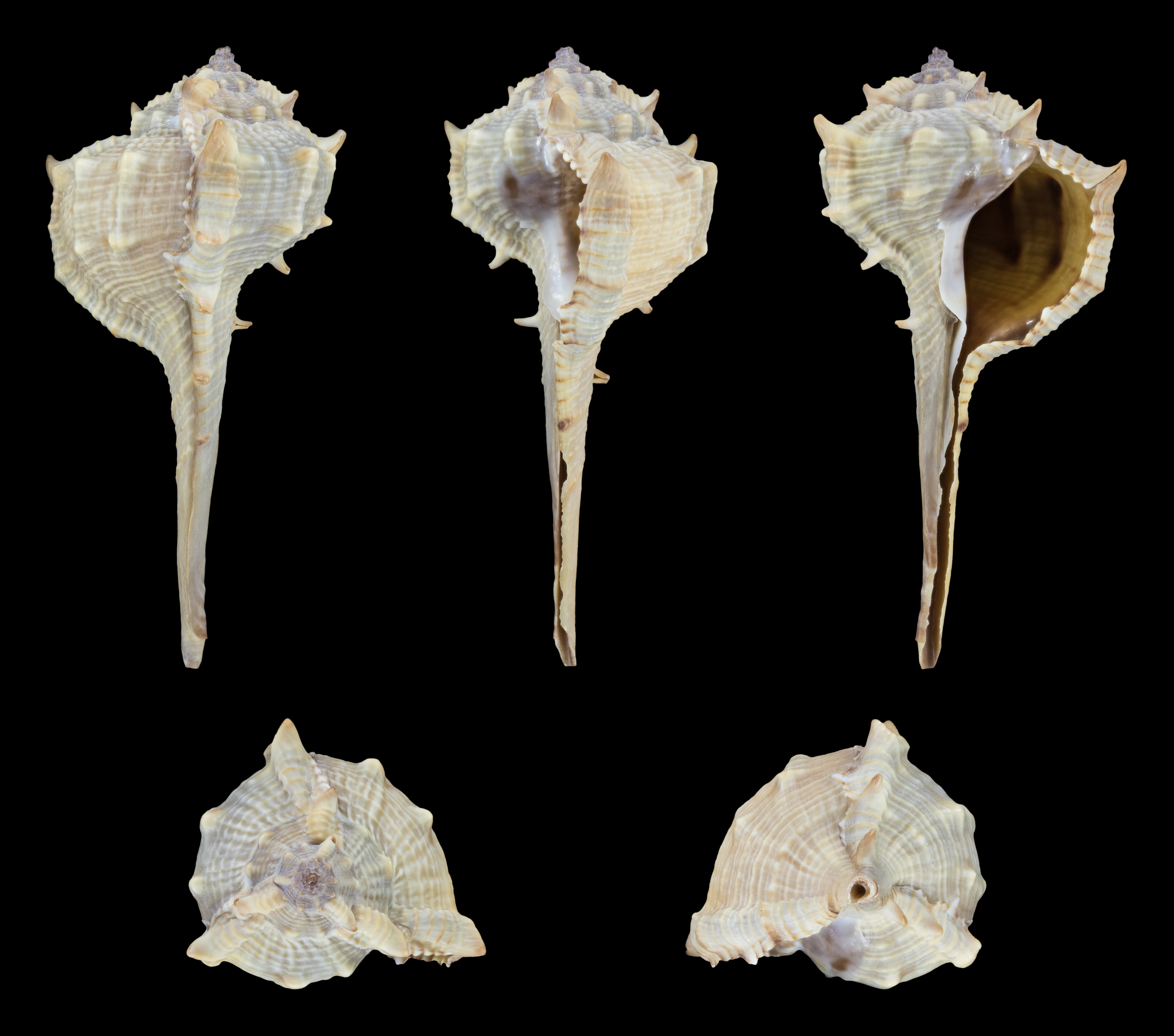

Scientific classification
- Kingdom: Animalia
- Phylum: Mollusca
- Class: Gastropoda
- Subclass: Caenogastropoda
- Order: Neogastropoda
- Family: Muricidae
- Genus: Murex
- Species: M. brevispina

Binomial name
- Murex brevispina Lamarck, 1822

Synonyms
- Murex (Murex) brevispina Lamarck, 1822· accepted, alternate representation; Tubicauda brevispina Jousseaume, 1880

= Murex brevispina =

Species of gastropod

Murex brevispina, also known as the Short-spined murex, is a species of large predatory sea snail, a marine gastropod mollusk in the family Muricidae, the rock snails or murex snails.

Subspecies

- Murex brevispina brevispina Lamarck, 1822
- Murex brevispina macgillivrayi Dohrn, 1862
- Murex brevispina ornamentalis Ponder & E. H. Vokes, 1988
- Murex brevispina senilis Jousseaume, 1874
- Murex brevispina toliaraensis Bozzetti, 2020
- Murex brevispina albus Bozzetti, 2020: synonym of Murex brevispina toliaraensis Bozzetti, 2020 (invalid: junior homonym of Murex craticulatus var. albus Scacchi, 1836; M. brevispina toliaraensis is a replacement name)
