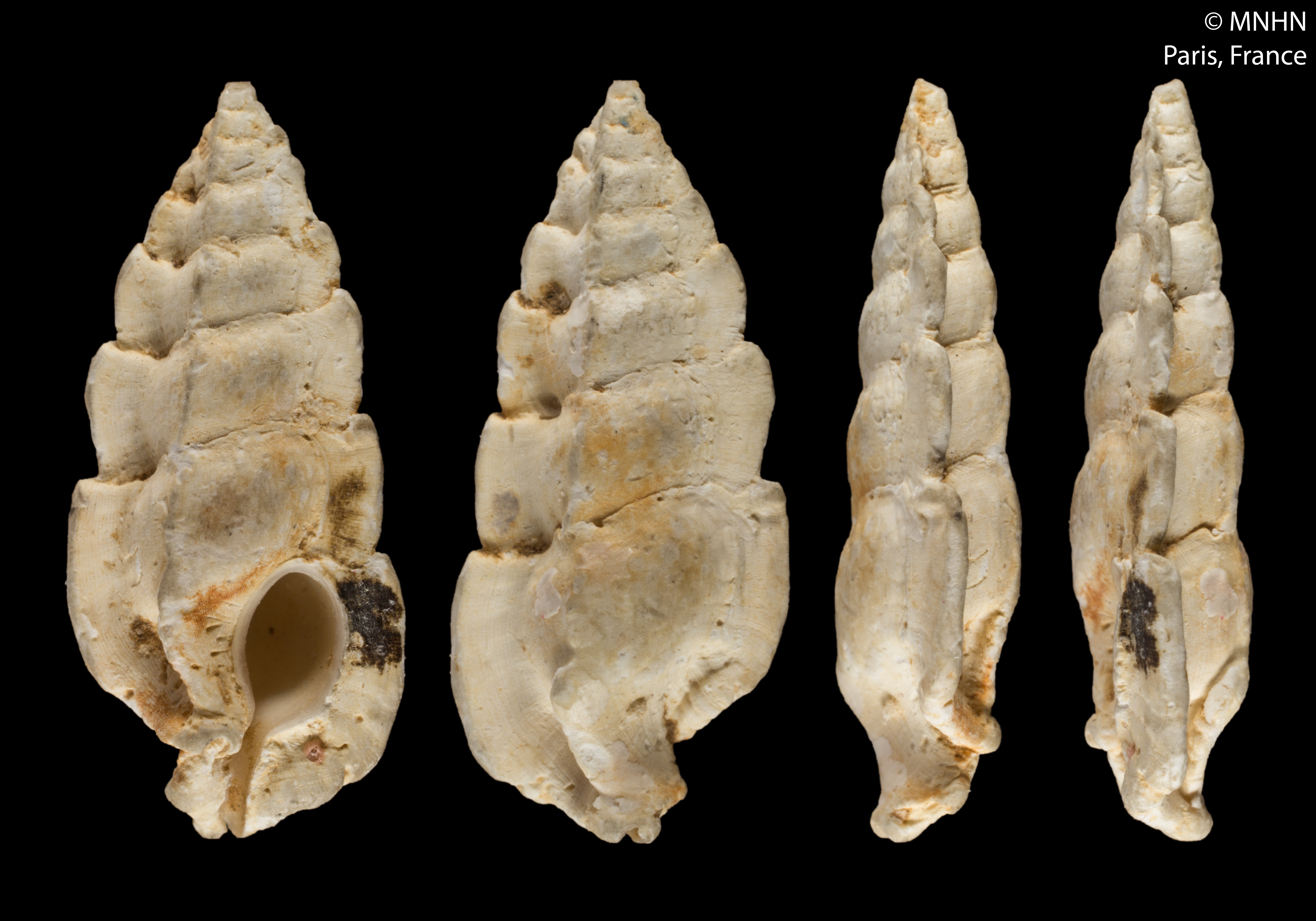
- Shell of Aspella vokesiana (holotype at MNHN, Paris)

Scientific classification
- Kingdom: Animalia
- Phylum: Mollusca
- Class: Gastropoda
- Subclass: Caenogastropoda
- Order: Neogastropoda
- Family: Muricidae
- Genus: Aspella
- Species: A. vokesiana

Binomial name
- Aspella vokesiana Houart, 1983

= Aspella vokesiana =

Species of gastropod

Aspella vokesiana is a species of sea snail, a marine gastropod mollusc in the family Muricidae, the murex snails or rock snails.
