= Aspella acuticostata =

Scientific classification
- Kingdom: Animalia
- Phylum: Mollusca
- Class: Gastropoda
- Subclass: Caenogastropoda
- Order: Neogastropoda
- Family: Muricidae
- Genus: Aspella
- Species: A. acuticostata

Binomial name
- Aspella acuticostata (Turton, 1932)

Synonyms
- Ranella acuticostata Turton, 1932

Species of gastropod

Aspella acuticostata is a species of sea snail, a marine gastropod mollusc in the family Muricidae, the murex snails or rock snails.
