= Dermomurex trondleorum =

Scientific classification
- Kingdom: Animalia
- Phylum: Mollusca
- Class: Gastropoda
- Subclass: Caenogastropoda
- Order: Neogastropoda
- Family: Muricidae
- Genus: Dermomurex
- Species: D. trondleorum

Binomial name
- Dermomurex trondleorum Houart, 1990

Synonyms
- Dermomurex (Trialatella) trondleorum Houart, 1990

Species of gastropod

Dermomurex trondleorum is a species of sea snail, a marine gastropod mollusk in the family Muricidae, the murex snails or rock snails.

== Description ==
The length of the shell attains 17 mm. It is found in bottom sediments and feeds on prey.

== Distribution ==
This marine species occurs off French Polynesia and the Tuamotus.
