= Dermomurex glicksteini =

Scientific classification
- Kingdom: Animalia
- Phylum: Mollusca
- Class: Gastropoda
- Subclass: Caenogastropoda
- Order: Neogastropoda
- Family: Muricidae
- Genus: Dermomurex
- Species: D. glicksteini

Binomial name
- Dermomurex glicksteini Petuch, 1987

Synonyms
- Dermomurex (Dermomurex) glicksteini Petuch, 1987; Dermomurex (Trialatella) glicksteini Petuch, 1987

Species of gastropod

Dermomurex glicksteini is a species of sea snail, a marine gastropod mollusk in the family Muricidae, the murex snails or rock snails.

== Description ==
Original description: "Shell elongated, fusiform, with elevated spire and well developed siphonal canal; whorls with 3 large blade like varices; intervarical areas with 1 large, keeled axial nob, whorls ornamented with numerous raised spiral threads; aperture large, oval in shape; inner edge of lip with 6 large red denticles; shell color mottled khaki-green and tan, overlaid with darker tannish brown banding along the suture and on siphonal canal; intritacalx thick, chalky, light tan in color; interior of aperture light tan."

The shell grows to a length of 16 mm.

== Distribution ==
Locus typicus: "(Trawled from) 150 metres depth, off Palm Beach Island, Palm Beach County, Florida, USA."

This marine species occurs off Eastern Florida, USA and the Bermudas.
