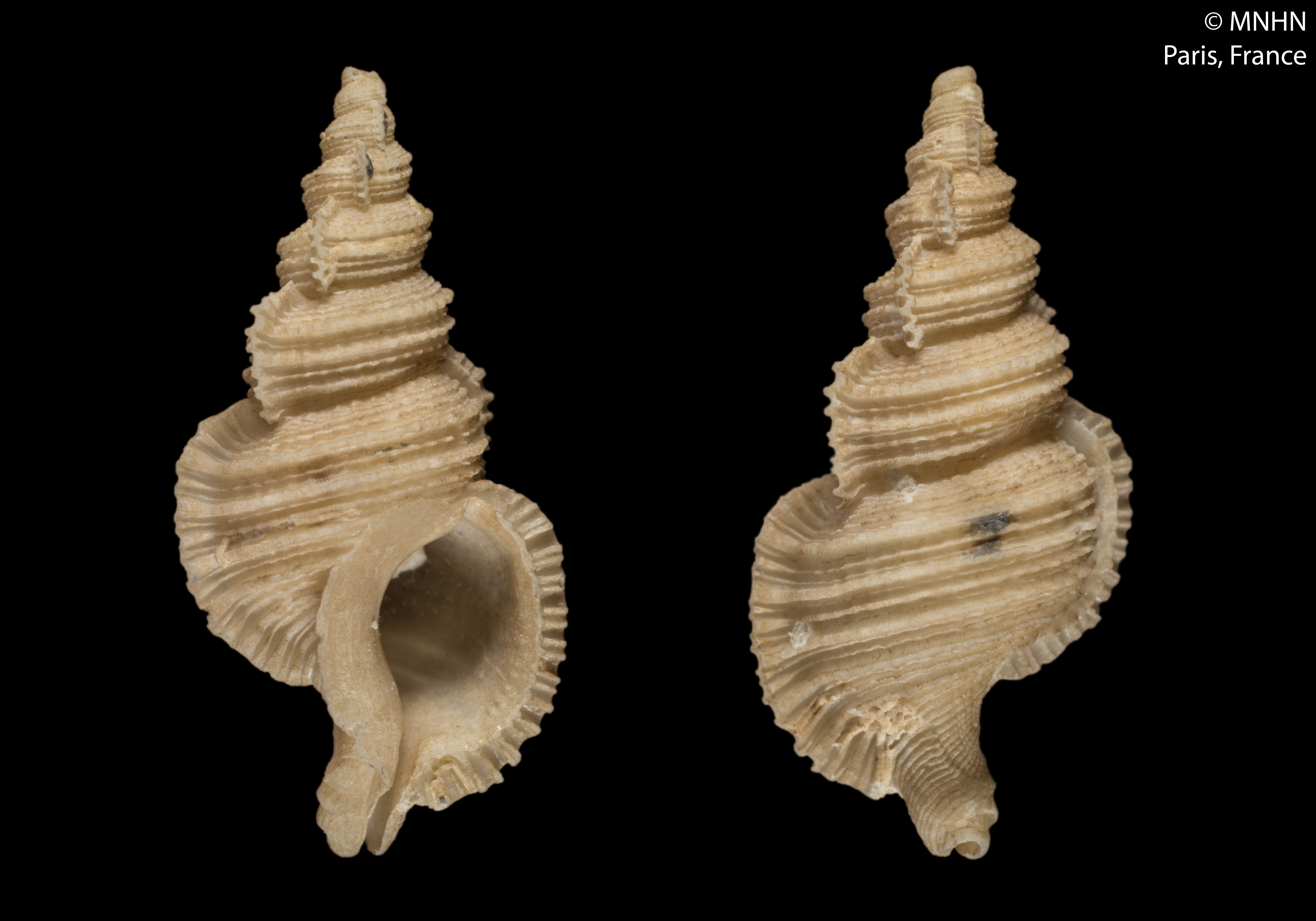
- Shell of Phyllocoma platyca (holotype at MNHN, Paris)

Scientific classification
- Kingdom: Animalia
- Phylum: Mollusca
- Class: Gastropoda
- Subclass: Caenogastropoda
- Order: Neogastropoda
- Family: Muricidae
- Genus: Phyllocoma
- Species: P. platyca

Binomial name
- Phyllocoma platyca Houart, 2001

= Phyllocoma platyca =

Species of gastropod

Phyllocoma (Phyllocoma) platyca is a species of sea snail, a marine gastropod mollusc in the family Muricidae, the murex or rock snails.

== Description ==
The length of the shell attains 19.4 mm (0.76 in).

== Distribution ==
This marine species occurs off Wallis and Futuna in the South Pacific.
