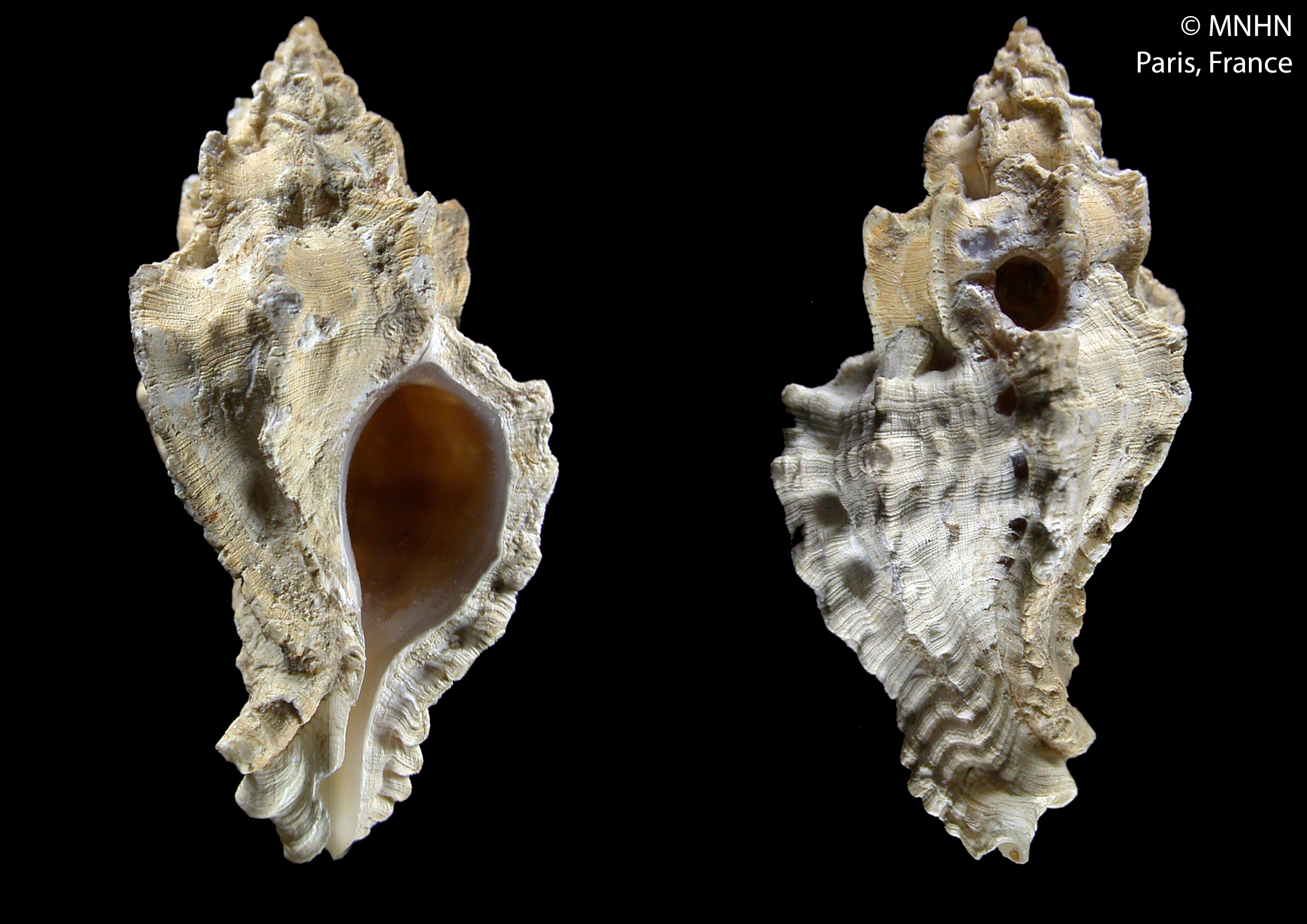
- Shell of Dermomurex alabastrum (specimen at MNHN, Paris)

Scientific classification
- Kingdom: Animalia
- Phylum: Mollusca
- Class: Gastropoda
- Subclass: Caenogastropoda
- Order: Neogastropoda
- Family: Muricidae
- Genus: Dermomurex
- Species: D. alabastrum

Binomial name
- Dermomurex alabastrum (A. Adams, 1864)

Synonyms
- Aspella paupercula varians Nowell-Usticke, 1969; Dermomurex (Dermomurex) alabastrum (A. Adams, 1864); Murex adamsii Kobelt, 1877; Murex alabastrum A. Adams, 1864; Trophon engonatus Dall, 1892

= Dermomurex alabastrum =

Species of gastropod

Dermomurex alabastrum is a species of small sea snail, a marine gastropod mollusk in the family Muricidae, the murex snails or rock snails.

== Description ==
The length of the adult shell varies between 16.8 mm and 30 mm.

== Distribution ==
The type locality for this species is Martinique, one of the Windward Islands, in the Lesser Antilles, West Indies. The species has also been found on Antigua and on Nevis. However it is perhaps more common on the Caribbean coast of Central America, having been found in Belize, Costa Rica, Panama, Colombia, and also in Venezuela.
