= Dermomurex obeliscus =

Scientific classification
- Kingdom: Animalia
- Phylum: Mollusca
- Class: Gastropoda
- Subclass: Caenogastropoda
- Order: Neogastropoda
- Family: Muricidae
- Genus: Dermomurex
- Species: D. obeliscus

Binomial name
- Dermomurex obeliscus (A. Adams, 1853)

Synonyms
- Dermomurex (Dermodurex) obeliscus (A. Adams, 1853); Murex obeliscus A. Adams, 1853 (basionym)

Species of gastropod

Dermomurex obeliscus is a species of sea snail, a marine gastropod mollusk in the family Muricidae, the murex snails or rock snails.

== Description ==
The length of the shell varies between 15 mm and 33 mm.

== Distribution ==
This species occurs in the Pacific Ocean from Mexico to Costa Rica.
