= Dermomurex neglectus =

Scientific classification
- Kingdom: Animalia
- Phylum: Mollusca
- Class: Gastropoda
- Subclass: Caenogastropoda
- Order: Neogastropoda
- Family: Muricidae
- Genus: Dermomurex
- Species: D. neglectus

Binomial name
- Dermomurex neglectus (Habe & Kosuge, 1971)

Synonyms
- Dermomurex neglecta (Habe & Kosuge, 1971); Dermomurex (Dermomurex) neglectus (Habe & Kosuge, 1971); Dermomurex (Trialatella) neglectus (Habe & Kosuge, 1971); Phyllocoma neglecta Habe & Kosuge, 1971

Species of gastropod

Dermomurex neglectus is a species of sea snail, a marine gastropod mollusk in the family Muricidae, the murex snails or rock snails.

== Description ==
The shell grows to a length of 20 mm.

== Distribution ==
This species occurs in the Pacific Ocean off the Philippines.
