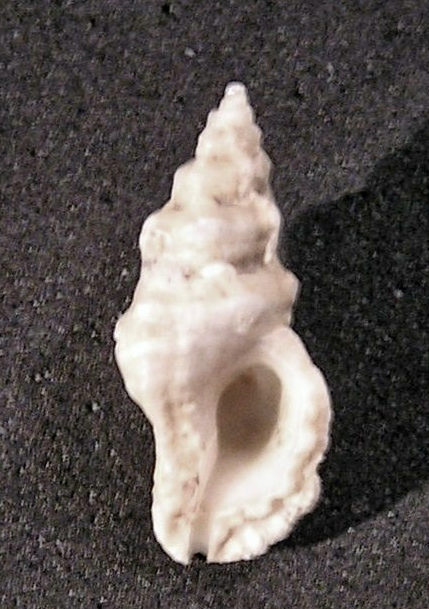
- Apertural view of a shell of Dermomurex elizabethae

Scientific classification
- Kingdom: Animalia
- Phylum: Mollusca
- Class: Gastropoda
- Subclass: Caenogastropoda
- Order: Neogastropoda
- Family: Muricidae
- Genus: Dermomurex
- Species: D. elizabethae

Binomial name
- Dermomurex elizabethae (McGinty, 1940)

Synonyms
- Aspella elizabethae McGinty, 1940 (basionym); Dermomurex (Gracilimurex) elizabethae (McGinty, 1940)

= Dermomurex elizabethae =

Species of gastropod

Dermomurex elizabethae is a species of sea snail, a marine gastropod mollusk in the family Muricidae, the murex snails or rock snails.

== Description ==
The length of the shell varies between 10 mm and 20 mm.

== Distribution ==
This species occurs in the Gulf of Mexico, the Caribbean Sea and the Lesser Antilles, and in the Atlantic Ocean off the Bermudas.
