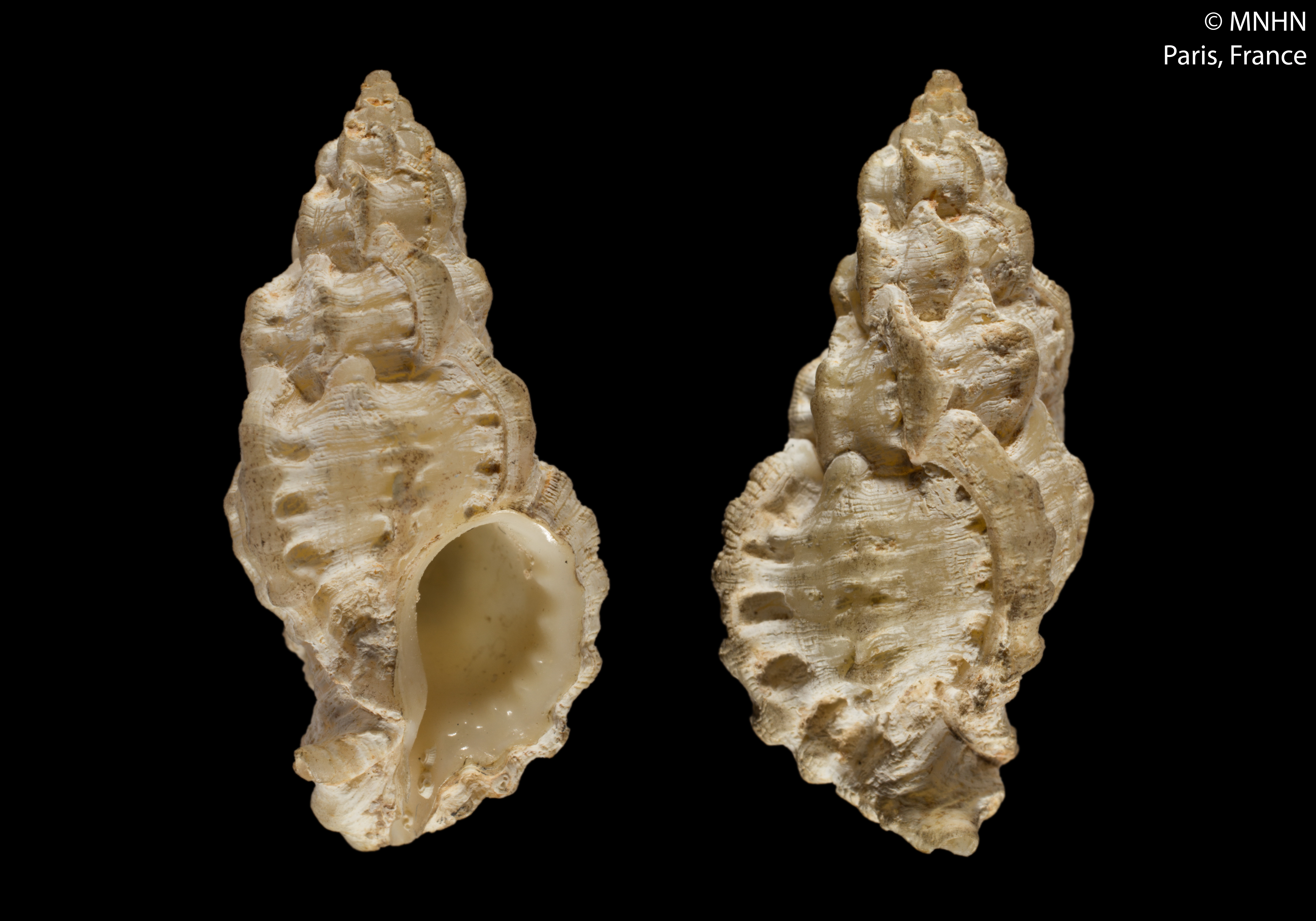

Scientific classification
- Kingdom: Animalia
- Phylum: Mollusca
- Class: Gastropoda
- Subclass: Caenogastropoda
- Order: Neogastropoda
- Family: Muricidae
- Genus: Dermomurex
- Species: D. pauperculus

Binomial name
- Dermomurex pauperculus (Adams, 1850)

Synonyms
- Aspella paupercula (Adams, 1850); Dermomurex pauperculus (Adams, 1850); Murex pauperculus Adams, 1850; Triton cantraini Recluz, 1853

= Dermomurex pauperculus =

Species of gastropod

Dermomurex pauperculus, common name the little aspella, is a species of sea snail, a marine gastropod mollusk in the family Muricidae, the murex snails or rock snails.

== Description ==
The length of the shell varies between 12 mm and 30 mm.

Its diet consists of bivalves such as oysters, muscles, and clams and feeds on them by plunging a hole through the mollusks shell. They also eat carrion and other dead animals.

== Distribution ==
This species occurs in the Caribbean Sea and the Lesser Antilles; in the Atlantic Ocean from North Carolina to Brazil. They are found in shallow near shore waters.
