= Dermomurex bakeri =

Scientific classification
- Kingdom: Animalia
- Phylum: Mollusca
- Class: Gastropoda
- Subclass: Caenogastropoda
- Order: Neogastropoda
- Family: Muricidae
- Genus: Dermomurex
- Species: D. bakeri

Binomial name
- Dermomurex bakeri (Hertlein & Strong, 1951)

Synonyms
- Aspella bakeri Hertlein & Strong, 1951; Dermomurex (Gracilimurex) bakeri (Hertlein & Strong, 1951); Murex bicolor Thiele, 1929

Species of gastropod

Dermomurex bakeri is a species of sea snail, a marine gastropod mollusk in the family Muricidae, the murex snails or rock snails.

== Description ==
The shell grows to a length of 18 mm.

== Distribution ==
This marine species occurs in the Gulf of California, Western Mexico.
