= Pyramidalis =

Pyramidalis, pyramidal in Latin, may refer to:

- Pyramidalis muscle, a small and triangular muscle, anterior to the Rectus abdominis, and contained in the rectus sheath in human anatomy
- Pyramidalis nasi, a small pyramidal slip of muscle deep to the superior orbital nerve, artery and vein
- Pyramidal muscle of auricle, an extension of the fibers of the muscle of tragus to the spine of helix
- Ulmus procera 'Pyramidalis', an English elm cultivar
- a rosemary cultivar
