= Emily H. Vokes =

American paleontologist

- Born: May 21, 1930 (age 96); Monroe, Louisiana
- Education: Tulane University
- Scientific career
- Fields: Malacology, Paleontology
- Workplaces: Tulane University (retired 1996)

Emily Hoskins Vokes (born May 21, 1930) is an American malacologist, palaeontologist, and former university professor. She is an authority on the Muricidae, a large and diverse family of predatory sea snails, or marine gastropod mollusks. Vokes worked both on her own and with her husband, geologist Harold Ernest Vokes.

== Education and personal life ==
Emily Hoskins was born in Monroe, Louisiana, but the family moved to New Orleans when she was eight. Vokes attended Newcomb College, then the women's undergraduate college of Tulane University, but dropped out, uncertain of her future career. She went to work for the Biophysics Laboratory and found her way to the Geology Department, where she became interested in geomorphology and later paleontology. In 1955 she re-enrolled as an undergraduate, but because Newcomb College did not then offer geology degrees to its women students, Vokes switched to Tulane. She completed her B.S. degree in geology in 1960, while working part-time as a curator of fossils. Following this she obtained both her M.S. (1962) and Ph.D. (1967) degrees from Tulane.

In 1959, Vokes married geologist Harold Ernest Vokes (1908–1998), whom she had met in 1956 when he came to Tulane to run the Geology Department. She often collaborated with him on scientific research. She published 147 articles and books alongside the 144 published under his name.

== Career ==
Vokes began her academic career at Tulane University in 1969 as an instructor for University College, where she worked until 1973. That year, she became an associate professor at Newcomb College. She was promoted to full professor in 1981, and later served as chair of the Geology Department and as dean of Newcomb College. She retired in 1996 and became an emerita professor. She held the post of curator for the Geology Department's collections until 1974.

Vokes and her husband helped to start a summer field-work camp in Mexico, and for over a decade they traveled annually to the Yucatan Peninsula to study molluscs, resulting in their book Distribution of Shallow-Water Marine Mollusca, Yucatan Peninsula, Mexico (1983).

In 1968 Vokes collected fossils in Central America, especially Costa Rica and Panama. In 1971, she spent a sabbatical collecting fossils in South America (Ecuador, Argentina, Chile, Peru) and teaching at Brazil's University of Rio Grande do Sul. In 1971, Vokes published a large study of the genus Murex, entitled "Catalogue of the Genus Murex Linné (Mollusca:Gastropoda)". At the time of publication, some 2500 species had been named in the Linnaean genus Murex, and Vokes attempted to reassign each species to its correct genus.

Between 1976 and 1986, Vokes spent a good deal of time surveying fossils in the Dominican Republic. Some of this work was part of a larger project coordinated with other researchers that aimed to identify the origins of various species found in the rock formations of the Dominican Republic. This research resulted in another of her major works, "Neogene paleontology in the Northern Dominican Republic 18: The superfamily Volutacea (in part) (Mollusca:Gastropoda)", a 1998 study of the superfamily Volutacea found in the Dominican Republic. It focused on a particular group of taxa that tend to be characterized by folding of the axial part of the shell. She was an editor of the Tulane Geology Department's journal, Tulane Studies in Geology and Paleontology.

Vokes and her husband were the core of the paleontological research program at Tulane University, and their fossil collections were extensive. These collections included research findings from excursions to the southeastern United States, Mexico, the Dominican Republic, South America, and Europe. Vokes and her husband collected from 1546 localities, their specimens filling over 72 square yards of cabinet space. A large number of their specimens have been transferred to the Smithsonian, the University of Florida, and the Paleontological Research Institution.

== Later years ==
In retirement, Vokes moved to Ponchatoula, Louisiana, where she opened an antique shop.

In 2010, Vokes took part in a Tulane-sponsored trip to South Africa, where the group participated in a tree-planting program in Soweto.

== Selected works ==
- "Catalogue of the Genus Murex Linné (Mollusca:Gastropoda): Muricinae, Ocenebrinae." Bulls. Amer. Paleo. 61.268 (1971):1-141.
- Distribution of Shallow-Water Marine Mollusca, Yucatan Peninsula, Mexico (1983, with Harold Vokes).
- "A Revision of the Indo-West Pacific Fossil and Recent Species of Murex ss and Haustellum (Mollusca: Gastropoda: Muricidae)." Records of the Australian Museum 8 (1988): 1-160. (With W. F. Ponder)
- "Neogene Paleontology of the Northern Dominican Republic 8: The family Muricidae (Mollusca:Gastropoda)." Bulls. Amer. Paleo. 97.332 (1989): 5-94.
- "Cenozoic Muricidae of the western Atlantic region, Part IX - Pterynotus, Poirieria, Aspella, Dermomurex, Calotrophon, Acantholabia, and Attiliosa; additions and corrections." Tulane Stud. Geol. Paleont. 25 (1992): 1-108.
- "Cenozoic Muricidae of the western Atlantic region. Part X - The subfamily Muricopsinae." Tulane Stud. Geol. Paleont. 26 (1994): 49-160.
- "One last look at the Muricidae." Amer. Conch. 24 (1996): 4-6.
- "Neogene Paleontology in the Northern Dominican Republic 18: The superfamily Volutacea (in part) (Mollusca:Gastropoda)." Bulls. Amer. Paleo. 113.354 (1998): 1-54.

== Awards and legacy ==
Tulane created the Emily Vokes Faculty Service Award to recognize lifetime service to the School of Professional Advancement. The award honors Vokes's service to continuing education at Tulane, including pioneering Saturday classes. In 2014, it also established the title Vokes Geology Professor, awarded in honor of both Emily and Harold Vokes.

The Drs. Emily H. and Harold E. Vokes Grants-in-Aid for Invertebrate Paleontology Collection-Based Research are given to advanced undergraduate students from anywhere in the United States who wish to use the collections at the Florida Museum of Natural History for paleobiological research.

The fossil muricid gastropod Argenthina emilyae was named in her honor.
