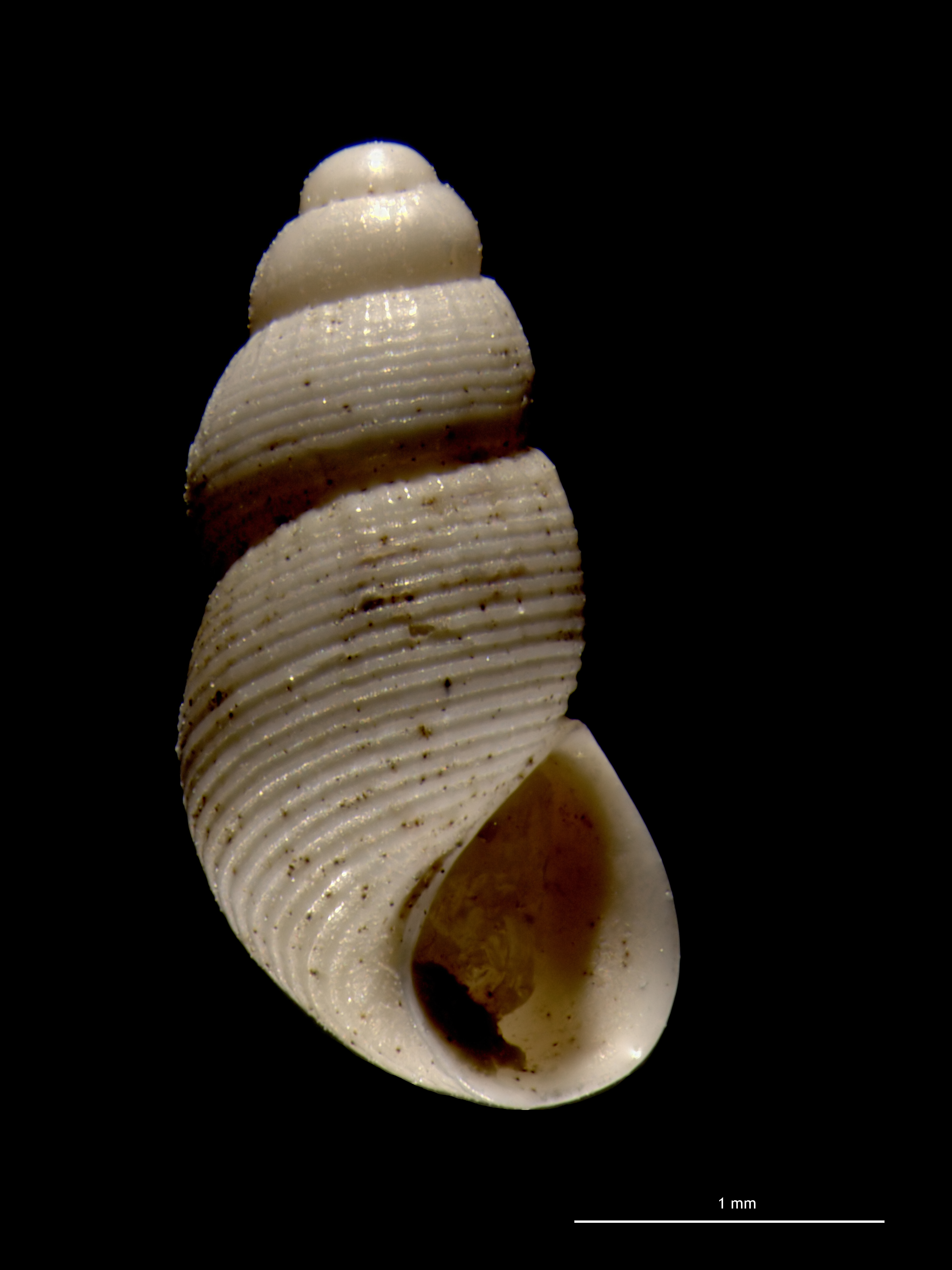
- Onoba aculeus shell

Scientific classification
- Kingdom: Animalia
- Phylum: Mollusca
- Class: Gastropoda
- Subclass: Caenogastropoda
- Order: Littorinimorpha
- Family: Rissoidae
- Genus: Onoba; H. Adams & A. Adams, 1852

Type species
- Turbo striatus J. Adams, 1797

Synonyms
- Liroculma Ponder, 1967; Manawatawhia Powell, 1937; Onoba (Manawatawhia) Powell, 1937; † Onoba (Manawatawhia) aedicula (Laws, 1940) accepted, alternate representation; Onoba (Onoba) H. Adams & A. Adams, 1852; Onoba (Ovirissoa) Hedley, 1916; Onoba (Subestea) Cotton, 1944; Ovirissoa Hedley, 1916; Subestea Cotton, 1944; Subonoba Iredale, 1915

= Onoba (gastropod) =

Genus of gastropods

Onoba is a genus of minute sea snails, marine gastropod mollusks or micromollusks in the family Rissoidae.

== Species ==
Species within the genus Onoba include:

- Onoba aculeus (Gould, 1841)
- Onoba aedonis (Watson, 1886)
- Onoba alaskana (Dall, 1886)
- Onoba algida Ponder & Worsfold, 1994
- Onoba amissa Ponder & Worsfold, 1994
- Onoba analoga (Powell, 1937)
- Onoba anderssoni (Strebel, 1908)
- Onoba aurivillii (Dall, 1887)
- Onoba bakeri (Bartsch, 1910)
- Onoba biangulata (Laws, 1936) †
- Onoba brachia (Watson, 1886)
- Onoba breogani Rolán, 2008
- Onoba brunnea Golikov & Kussakin, 1978
- Onoba carpenteri (Weinkauff, 1885)
- Onoba castanella (Dall, 1886)
- Onoba cerinella Dall, 1887
- Onoba cingulata (Middendorff, 1849)
- Onoba compsa Bartsch in Golikov, Gulbin & Sirenko, 1987
- Onoba crassicordata Worsfold, Avern & Ponder, 1993
- Onoba cryptolira (Laws, 1950) †
- Onoba dalli (Bartsch, 1927)
- Onoba delecta Ponder, 1983
- Onoba delli (Ponder, 1968)
- Onoba dimassai Amati & Nofroni, 1991
- Onoba duplicata (Powell, 1937)
- Onoba egorovae Numanami, 1996
- Onoba elegans (Ponder, 1965)
- Onoba emiliorolani Engl, 2011
- Onoba erugata Ponder & Worsfold, 1994
- Onoba exarata (Stimpson, 1851)
- Onoba exuta (Powell, 1937)
- Onoba filostria (Melvill & Standen, 1912)
- Onoba forresterensis (Willett, 1934)
- Onoba fortis Pilsbry & Olsson, 1941
- Onoba fuegoensis (Strebel, 1908)
- Onoba fusiformis (Carpenter, 1847)
- Onoba galaica Rolán, 2008
- Onoba georgiana (Pfeffer, 1886)
- Onoba gianninii (Nordsieck, 1974)
- Onoba gibbera (Laws, 1950) †
- Onoba gigas Bozzetti, 2008
- Onoba glaphyra (Watson, 1886)
- Onoba grisea (Martens, 1885)
- Onoba guzmani Hoenselaar & Moolenbeek, 1987
- Onoba improcera (Warén, 1996)
- Onoba inflatella (Thiele, 1912)
- Onoba islandica (Friele, 1876)
- Onoba josae Moolenbeek & Hoenselaar, 1987
- Onoba kergueleni (Smith, 1875)
- Onoba klausgrohi Engl, 2011
- Onoba kurilensis Golikov & Kussakin, 1974
- Onoba kyskensis (Bartsch, 1911)
- Onoba lactea (Finlay, 1926) †
- Onoba lacuniformis Ponder & Worsfold, 1994
- Onoba lantzi (Vélain, 1877)
- Onoba laticingulata Golikov & Kussakin, 1978
- Onoba leptalea (Verrill, 1884)
- Onoba lincta (Watson, 1873)
- Onoba lubrica (Suter, 1908)
- Onoba melvilli (Hedley, 1916)
- Onoba merelinoides Worsfold, Avern & Ponder, 1993
- Onoba mighelsii (Stimpson, 1851)
- Onoba moreleti Dautzenberg, 1889
- Onoba multilirata (May, 1915)
- Onoba muriei (Bartsch & Rehder, 1939)
- Onoba nunezi Rolán & Hernández, 2004
- Onoba obliqua (Warén, 1974)
- Onoba oliverioi Smriglio & Mariottini, 2000
- Onoba palmeri (Dall, 1919)
- Onoba paucicarinata Ponder, 1983
- Onoba paucilirata (Melvill & Standen, 1916)
- Onoba paupereques (Finlay, 1926)
- Onoba perplexa (Finlay, 1924) †
- Onoba protofimbriata Ponder & Worsfold, 1994
- Onoba protopustulata Ponder & Worsfold, 1994
- Onoba rubicunda (Tate & May, 1900)
- Onoba russica Golikov, 1986
- Onoba schraderi (Strebel, 1908)
- Onoba schythei (Philippi, 1868)
- Onoba semicostata (Montagu, 1803)
- Onoba simplex (Powell, 1927)
- Onoba stampinensis Lozouet & Maestrati, 1982
- Onoba steineni (Strebel, 1908)
- Onoba striola Ponder & Worsfold, 1994
- Onoba suavis (Thiele, 1925)
- Onoba subaedonis Ponder & Worsfold, 1994
- Onoba subantarctica (Hedley, 1916)
- Onoba subincisa Ponder & Worsfold, 1994
- Onoba sulcula Ponder & Worsfold, 1994
- Onoba tarifensis Hoenselaar & Moolenbeek, 1987
- Onoba tenuistriata Golikov, Gulbin & Sirenko, 1987
- Onoba torelli (Warén, 1996)
- Onoba transenna (Watson, 1886)
- Onoba tristanensis Worsfold, Avern & Ponder, 1993
- Onoba zebina (Finlay, 1930) †

Species brought into synonymy

- Onoba aculea (Gould, 1841): synonym of Onoba aculeus (Gould, 1841)
- Onoba bassiana Hedley, 1911: synonym of Botelloides bassianus (Hedley, 1911)
- Onoba bickertoni (Hedley, 1916): synonym of Subonoba turqueti (Lamy, 1905)
- Onoba candida (Brown, 1844): synonym of Onoba semicostata (Montagu, 1803)
- Onoba castanea (Møller, 1842): synonym of Boreocingula castanea (Møller, 1842)
- Onoba cristallinula (Manzoni, 1868): synonym of Crisilla cristallinula (Manzoni, 1868)
- Onoba cruzi (Castellanos & Fernández, 1974): synonym of Alvania cruzi (Castellanos & Fernández, 1974)
- Onoba cymatodes Melvill & Standen, 1916: synonym of Fictonoba cymatodes (Melvill & Standen, 1916)
- Onoba delicata Philippi, 1849: synonym of Iravadia delicata (Philippi, 1849)
- Onoba elongata Hornung & Mermod, 1928: synonym of Iravadia elongata (Hornung & Mermod, 1928)
- Onoba ferruginea A. Adams, 1861: synonym of Alvania ferruginea A. Adams, 1861
- Onoba gelida (Smith, 1907): synonym of Subonoba gelida (Smith, 1907)
- Onoba jeffreysi (Waller, 1864): synonym of Alvania jeffreysi (Waller, 1864)
- Onoba karica Golikov, 1986: synonym of Onoba aculeus (Gould, 1841)
- Onoba manzoniana Rolán, 1987: synonym of Manzonia manzoniana (Rolán, 1987)
- Onoba moerchi Collin, 1886: synonym of Alvania moerchi (Collin, 1886)
- Onoba ovata (Thiele, 1912): synonym of Subonoba ovata (Thiele, 1912)
- Onoba pelagica (Stimpson, 1851): synonym of Frigidoalvania pelagica (Stimpson, 1851)
- Onoba philippinica O. Boettger, 1893: synonym of Iravadia delicata (Philippi, 1849)
- Onoba quadrasi O. Boettger, 1893: synonym of Pellamora densilabrum (Melvill, 1912)
- Onoba scotiana (Melvill & Standen, 1907): synonym of Onoba semicostata (Montagu, 1803)
- Onoba striata (J. Adams, 1797): synonym of Onoba semicostata (Montagu, 1803)
- Onoba sulcata (Strebel, 1908): synonym of Onoba grisea (Martens, 1885)
- Onoba tenuilirata Boettger, 1893: synonym of Iravadia tenuilirata (Boettger, 1893)
- Onoba turqueti (Lamy, 1905): synonym of Subonoba turqueti (Lamy, 1905)
- Onoba verrilli: synonym of Alvania verrilli (Friele, 1886)
- Onoba vigoensis Rolán, 1983: synonym of Manzonia vigoensis (Rolán, 1983)
- Onoba vitrea (Montagu): synonym of Hyala vitrea (Montagu, 1803)
- Onoba wareni Templado & Rolán, 1986: synonym of Alvania wareni (Templado & Rolán, 1986)
