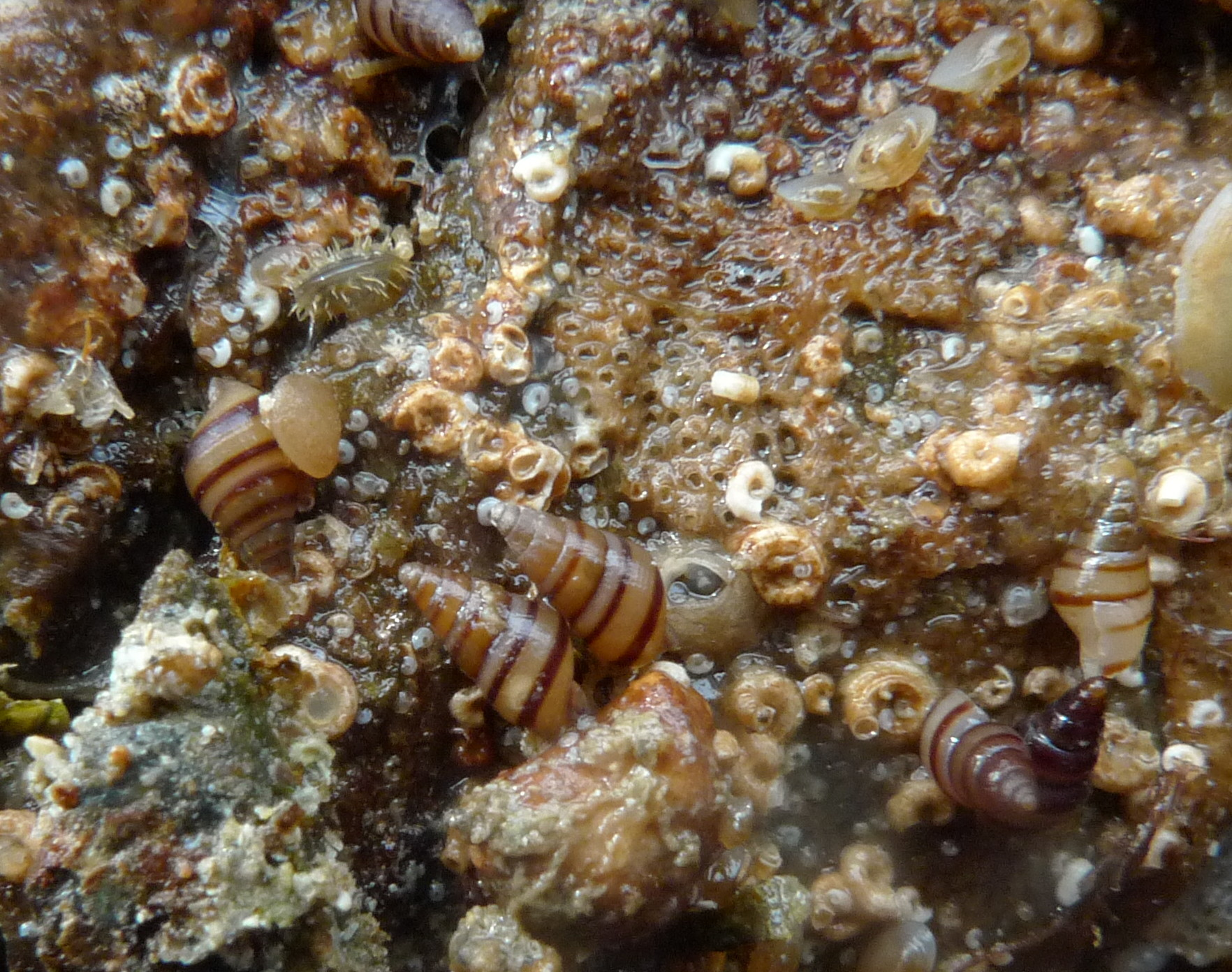
- Cingula trifasciata

Scientific classification
- Kingdom: Animalia
- Phylum: Mollusca
- Class: Gastropoda
- Subclass: Caenogastropoda
- Order: Littorinimorpha
- Superfamily: Rissooidea
- Family: Rissoidae
- Genus: Cingula; Fleming, 1818

Type species
- Cingula trifasciata (Adams J., 1800)

Species
- See text

Synonyms
- Cingilla Monterosato, 1884; Cingula (Lirocingula) Ponder, 1985· accepted, alternate representation; Rissoa (Cingula) J. Fleming, 1818; Rissoia (Cingula) J. Fleming, 1818; Sabanaea Leach in Gray, 1847; Sabanea [sic] (misspelling of Sabanaea Leach in Gray, 1847 (October) by Gray (1847: November))

= Cingula =

Genus of gastropods

Cingula is a genus of minute sea snails, marine gastropod mollusks or micromollusks in the family Rissoidae.

== Species ==
Species within the genus Cingula include:

- Cingula aequa (E. A. Smith, 1890)
- Cingula agapeta (E. A. Smith, 1890)
- Cingula alvearium (Watson, 1886)
- Cingula arenaria Mighels and C. B. Adams, 1842
- Cingula atomaria A. A. Gould, 1861
- Cingula carinata Mighels and C. B. Adams, 1842
- Cingula communis O. Boettger, 1906 †
- Cingula compsa (E. A. Smith, 1890)
- Cingula conoidea Thiele, 1930
- Cingula conspecta (E. A. Smith, 1904)
- Cingula dautzenbergi Glibert, 1949 †
- Cingula dharma (Yokoyama, 1926) †
- Cingula farquhari (E. A. Smith, 1910)
- Cingula fernandinae (Dall, 1927)
- Cingula helenae (Ponder, 1985)
- Cingula inconspicua C. B. Adams, 1852
- Cingula koeneni Glibert, 1952 †
- Cingula ligeriana Peyrot, 1938 †
- Cingula madreporica Issel, 1869
- Cingula miocenica Peyrot, 1938 †
- Cingula montereyensis Bartsch, 1912
- Cingula nitidula Thiele, 1930
- Cingula obtusispira Seguenza, 1879 †
- Cingula outis (Tomlin, 1931)
- Cingula paradoxa Thiele, 1930
- Cingula parryensis Ladd, 1966 †
- Cingula paulmyensis Peyrot, 1938 †
- Cingula pentodonta (Kendall & Bell, 1886) †
- Cingula perfecta (E. A. Smith, 1890)
- Cingula psammatica Issel, 1869
- Cingula pupina Cossmann, 1918
- Cingula regiorivi A. W. Janssen, 1967 †
- Cingula scipio Dall, 1887
- Cingula simulans (E. A. Smith, 1890)
- Cingula sternbergensis R. Janssen, 1978 †
- Cingula stewardsoni (Vanatta, 1909)
- Cingula trifasciata (J. Adams, 1800)
- Cingula turonensis Peyrot, 1938 †
- Cingula turoniensis Glibert, 1949 †
- Cingula vaga (E. A. Smith, 1890)
- Cingula varicifera (E. A. Smith, 1890)
- Cingula vera Cossmann & Peyrot, 1919 †
- Cingula villae Issel, 1869
- Cingula waabitica Issel, 1869
- Cingula wallichi (E. A. Smith, 1890)
- Cingula whitechurchi (Turton, 1932)
- Cingula winslowae (Bartsch, 1928)

Synonymized species

- Cingula alaskana Bartsch, 1912: synonym of Onoba mighelsi (Stimpson, 1851)
- Cingula alderi (Jeffreys, 1858): synonym of Obtusella intersecta (Wood S., 1857)
- Cingula aleutica Dall, 1887: synonym of Falsicingula aleutica (Dall, 1887)
- Cingula anselmoi van Aartsen & Engl, 1999: synonym of Setia anselmoi (van Aartsen & Engl, 1999)
- Cingula antipolitana van der Linden & W.M. Wagner, 1987: synonym of Setia antipolitana (van der Linden & Wagner, 1987)
- Cingula apicina Verrill, 1884: synonym of Epitonium frielei (Dall, 1889)
- Cingula arenaria auct. non Maton & Rackett, 1807: synonym of Onoba mighelsii (Stimpson, 1851)
- Cingula beniamina Monterosato, 1844: synonym of Crisilla beniamina (Monterosato, 1884)
- Cingula castanea (Möller, 1842): synonym of Boreocingula castanea (Møller, 1842)
- Cingula cingillus (Montagu, 1803): synonym of Cingula trifasciata (J. Adams, 1800)
- Cingula eyerdami Willett, 1934: synonym of Onoba carpenteri (Weinkauff, 1885)
- Cingula forresterensis Willett, 1934: synonym of Onoba forresterensis (Willett, 1934)
- Cingula globulus: synonym of Boreocingula globulus (Moller, 1842)
- Cingula griegi (Friele, 1879): synonym of Pusillina tumidula (G. O. Sars, 1878)
- Cingula jacksoni (Bartsch, 1953): synonym of Onobops jacksoni (Bartsch, 1953)
- Cingula katherinae Bartsch, 1911: synonym of Boreocingula martyni (Dall, 1886)
- Cingula moerchi Collin, 1887: synonym of Alvania moerchi (Collin, 1886)
- Cingula nitida: synonym of Peringiella elegans (Locard, 1892)
- Cingula parva (da Costa, 1778): synonym of Rissoa parva (da Costa, 1778)
- Cingula proxima: synonym of Ceratia proxima (Forbes & Hanley, 1850)
- Cingula semicostata (Montagu, 1803): synonym of Onoba semicostata (Montagu, 1803)
- Cingula semistriata Montagu: synonym of Crisilla semistriata (Montagu, 1808)
- Cingula striata Montagu: synonym of Onoba semicostata (Montagu, 1803)
- Cingula sulcata O. Boettger, 1893: synonym of Liroceratia sulcata (Boettger, 1893)
- Cingula vitrea: synonym of Hyala vitrea (Montagu, 1803)
