= Aculeus =

In biology, an aculeus a sharp, elongated spike or process that may refer to:

- Thorns, spines, and prickles in plants
- A modified ovipositor in some insects
- The stinger of scorpions

== See also ==
- Acropora aculeus
- Turbonilla aculeus
- Onoba aculeus
