= Torelli (disambiguation) =

Torelli is an Italian surname. It may also refer to:

- Torelli (Mercogliano), a village in the Province of Avellino, Campania, Italy
- Torelli (cycling team), Irish cycling team
- Italian submarine Luigi Torelli, a World War II submarine

== See also ==
- Torelli theorem, in algebraic geometry
- Onoba torelli, a species of sea snail
