= O. sulcata =

O. sulcata may refer to:

- Onoba sulcata, a sea snail species
- Oocorys sulcata, a sea snail species
