= Chevallieria columen =

Scientific classification
- Kingdom: Animalia
- Phylum: Mollusca
- Class: Gastropoda
- Subclass: Caenogastropoda
- Order: Littorinimorpha
- Family: Iravadiidae
- Genus: Chevallieria
- Species: C. columen

Binomial name
- Chevallieria columen (Melvill, 1904)

Synonyms
- Amphitalamus elspethae Melvill, 1910 ·; Amphitalamus elspethae Melvill, 1910; Rissoa (Scrobs) columen Melvill, 1904 superseded combination; Rissoa (Scrobs) elspethae Melvill, 1910 junior subjective synonym; Rissoa columen Melvill, 1904 superseded combination; Rissoa elspethae Melvill, 1910 junior subjective synonym; Rissoina columen (Melvill, 1904) superseded combination; Rissoina elspethae (Melvill, 1910) superseded combination

Species of gastropod

Chevallieria columen is a species of minute sea snail, a marine gastropod mollusc or micromollusk in the family Iravadiidae.

== Description ==
The length of the shell attains 4 mm, its diameter 1.3 mm.

(Original description in Latin) The shell is cylindrical, milky-white, and delicate, by no means shining. It possesses six whorls; the two apical ones are flattened at the apex itself, almost immersed, while the others are impressed at the sutures and appear stepped. The body whorl is almost straight and cylindrical. The aperture is ovate; the peristome is continuous, thickened, white, and expanded. The columella is oblique.

== Distribution ==
This species occurs in the Gulf of Oman.
