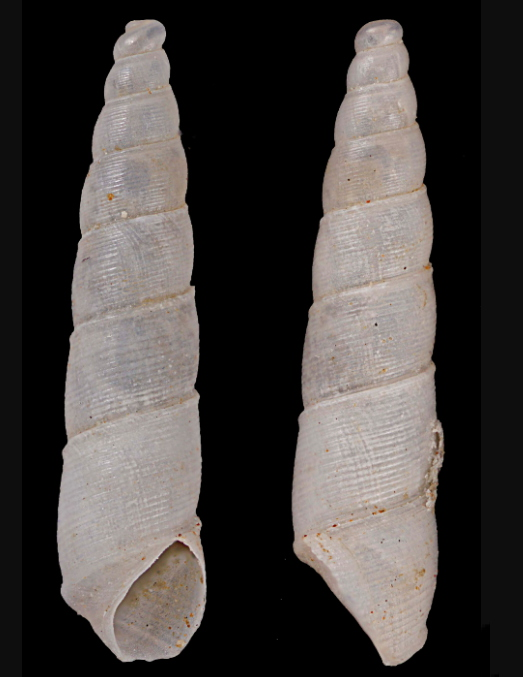
- Acliceratia beddomei (holotype at MNHN, Paris)

Scientific classification
- Kingdom: Animalia
- Phylum: Mollusca
- Class: Gastropoda
- Subclass: Caenogastropoda
- Order: Littorinimorpha
- Family: Iravadiidae
- Genus: Acliceratia
- Species: A. beddomei

Binomial name
- Acliceratia beddomei (Dautzenberg, 1912)

Synonyms
- Aclis beddomei Dautzenberg, 1912 (basionym)

= Acliceratia beddomei =

Species of gastropod

Acliceratia beddomei is a species of very small somewhat amphibious land snail with a gill and an operculum, a semi-terrestrial gastropod mollusk or micromollusk in the family Iravadiidae.

This species was named by Philippe Dautzenberg after his colleague M.Beddome.

== Description ==
The elongated, turreted shell has a uniform white color. The spire is composed of eight whorls, separated by a closely channeled suture. The protoconch is embryonic, smooth and convex. The two following whorls are also convex, but decorated with striae slightly decurrent. The others are less convex adorned with more pronounced decurrent striae. They show, below the suture, a quite acute projecting keel, that extends around the base of the body whorl. The aperture is oval, angular at the top. The columella is arcuate, surrounded by a callous bead, acuminate at the base.

== Distribution ==
The type specimen was retrieved in the Atlantic Ocean off Conakry, Guinea. It also occurs off Angola and Cape Esterias.
