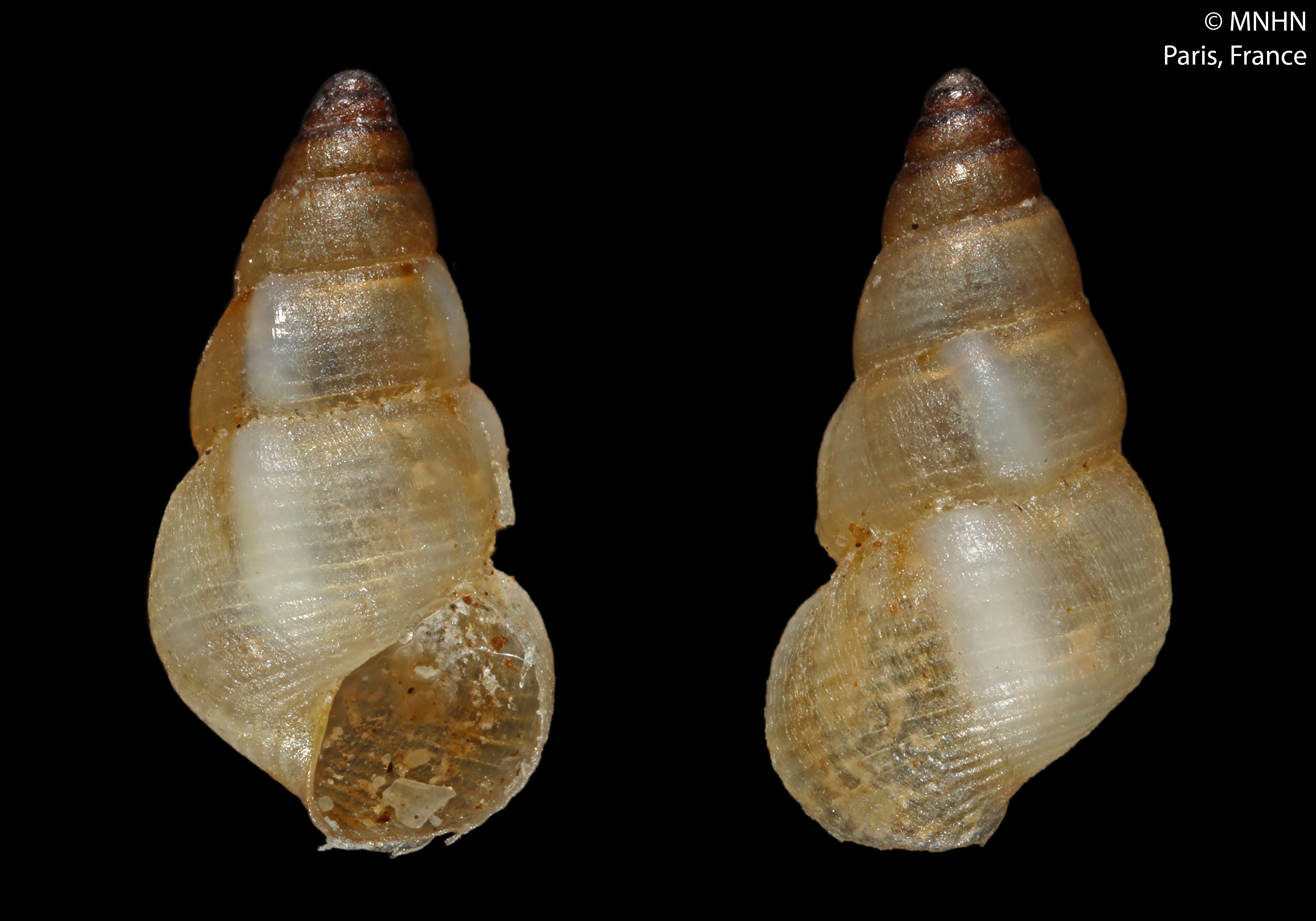
- Shell of Subonoba varicifera (holotype at MNHN, Paris)

Scientific classification
- Kingdom: Animalia
- Phylum: Mollusca
- Class: Gastropoda
- Subclass: Caenogastropoda
- Order: Littorinimorpha
- Superfamily: Rissooidea
- Family: Rissoidae
- Genus: Subonoba; Iredale, 1915

Type species
- Rissoia fumata Suter, 1898

Synonyms
- Subonoba (Austronoba) Powell, 1927

= Subonoba =

Genus of gastropods

Subonoba is a genus of small sea snails in the family Rissoidae.

== Species ==
The genus contains 26 species, including:

- Subonoba alpha Powell, 1955
- Subonoba aupouria Powell, 1940
- Subonoba beta Powell, 1955
- Subonoba candidissima (Webster, 1905)
- Subonoba delicatula Powell, 1933
- Subonoba delta Powell, 1955
- Subonoba edita Powell, 1939
- Subonoba fallai Powell, 1955
- Subonoba foveauxiana (Suter, 1898)
- Subonoba fumata (Suter, 1898)
- Subonoba gamma Powell, 1955
- Subonoba gelida (E.A. Smith, 1907)
- Subonoba inornata Powell, 1933
- Subonoba insculpta (Murdoch, 1905)
- Subonoba iredalei (Powell, 1937)
- Subonoba kermadecensis (Powell, 1927)
- Subonoba morioria Powell, 1933
- Subonoba obliquata (Powell, 1940)
- Subonoba oliveri Powell, 1955
- Subonoba ovata (Thiele, 1912)
- Subonoba parvula Powell, 1931
- Subonoba paucicostata Powell, 1931
- Subonoba sorenseni Powell, 1955
- Subonoba tenuistriata Powell, 1933
- Subonoba turqueti (Lamy, 1905)
- Subonoba varicifera Bozzetti, 2019

Synonyms

- Subonoba bickertoni Hedley, 1916: synonym of Onoba turqueti (Lamy, 1906): synonym of Subonoba turqueti (Lamy, 1906)
- Subonoba contigua Powell, 1957: synonym of Onoba gelida (E. A. Smith, 1907): synonym of Subonoba gelida (E.A. Smith, 1907)
- Subonoba deserta (E. A. Smith, 1907): synonym of Powellisetia deserta (E. A. Smith, 1907)
- Subonoba glacialis (E. A. Smith, 1907): synonym of Eatoniella glacialis (E. A. Smith, 1907)
- Subonoba subantarctica Thiele, 1912: synonym of Onoba subantarctica (Thiele, 1912) (original combination)
- Subonoba wilkesiana Hedley, 1916: synonym of Onoba subantarctica wilkesiana (Hedley, 1916) (original combination)
