= Boreocingula =

Scientific classification
- Kingdom: Animalia
- Phylum: Mollusca
- Class: Gastropoda
- Subclass: Caenogastropoda
- Order: Littorinimorpha
- Family: Rissoidae
- Genus: Boreocingula; Golikov & Kusakin, 1974

Genus of gastropods

Boreocingula is a genus of minute sea snails, marine gastropod mollusks or micromollusks in the family Rissoidae.

== Species ==
Species within the genus Boreocingula include:

- Boreocingula castanea (Møller, 1842)
- Boreocingula globulus (Moller, 1842)
- Boreocingula martyni
