= Onoba exarata =

Scientific classification
- Kingdom: Animalia
- Phylum: Mollusca
- Class: Gastropoda
- Subclass: Caenogastropoda
- Order: Littorinimorpha
- Family: Rissoidae
- Genus: Onoba
- Species: O. exarata

Binomial name
- Onoba exarata (Stimpson, 1851)

Synonyms
- Alvania exarata (Stimpson, 1851)

Species of gastropod

Onoba exarata is a species of small sea snail, a marine gastropod mollusk or micromollusk in the family Rissoidae.

== Description ==
The maximum recorded shell length is 3.3 mm.

== Habitat ==
Minimum recorded depth is 5 m. Maximum recorded depth is 5 m.
