= Pseudonoba =

Scientific classification
- Kingdom: Animalia
- Phylum: Mollusca
- Class: Gastropoda
- Subclass: Caenogastropoda
- Order: Littorinimorpha
- Superfamily: Truncatelloidea
- Family: Iravadiidae
- Genus: Pseudonoba; O. Boettger, 1902

Type species
- † Pseudonoba peculiaris O. Boettger, 1902

Species
- See text

Synonyms
- Dipsotoma Laseron, 1956; Iraqirissoa Dance & Eames, 1966; Iravadia (Pseudonoba) Boettger, 1902; Lucidinella Laseron, 1956; Paronoba Laseron, 1950

Genus of gastropods

Pseudonoba is a genus of sea snails, marine gastropod mollusks in the family Iravadiidae.

== Species ==
Species within the genus Pseudonoba include:

- Pseudonoba aristaei (Melvill, 1912)
- Pseudonoba atemeles (Melvill, 1896)
- Pseudonoba delicata (Philippi, 1849)
- Pseudonoba expansilabrum (Ponder, 1984)
- Pseudonoba gemmata (Ponder, 1984)
- Pseudonoba ictriella (Melvill, 1910)
- Pseudonoba inflata (Ponder, 1967)
- Pseudonoba padangensis (Thiele, 1925)
- † Pseudonoba peculiaris O. Boettger, 1902
- † Pseudonoba ponderi (Kiel, 2003)
- Pseudonoba profundior (Ponder, 1984)
- Pseudonoba sublevis (Laseron, 1956)
- Pseudonoba subquadrata (Laseron, 1950)
- † Pseudonoba tarbelliana Lozouet, 1998
- Pseudonoba yendoi (Yokoyama, 1927)
