= Onoba galaica =

Scientific classification
- Kingdom: Animalia
- Phylum: Mollusca
- Class: Gastropoda
- Subclass: Caenogastropoda
- Order: Littorinimorpha
- Family: Rissoidae
- Genus: Onoba
- Species: O. galaica

Binomial name
- Onoba galaica Rolán, 2008

Species of gastropod

Onoba galaica is a species of minute sea snail, a marine gastropod mollusk or micromollusk in the family Rissoidae.

== Description ==
This species shell is 2.8 mm long and is a light grey to light jade in colour.

== Distribution ==
Onoba galaica has been recorded off the west coast of Galicia.
