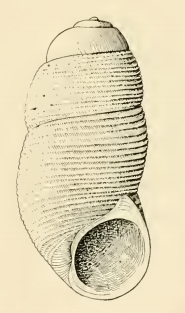
- Original drawing of a shell of Botelloides glomerosus

Scientific classification
- Kingdom: Animalia
- Phylum: Mollusca
- Class: Gastropoda
- Subclass: Vetigastropoda
- Order: Trochida
- Superfamily: Trochoidea
- Family: Trochidae
- Genus: Botelloides
- Species: B. glomerosus

Binomial name
- Botelloides glomerosus (Hedley, 1907)

Synonyms
- Botelloides bassianus bassianus (Hedley, C., 1911); Onoba glomerosa Hedley, 1907 (original description)

= Botelloides glomerosus =

Species of gastropod

Botelloides glomerosus is a species of sea snail, a marine gastropod mollusk in the family Trochidae, the top snails.

== Description ==
The size of the shell varies between 2.9 mm and 6 mm. The shell is small, solid, glossy, columnar, and blunt at either end. Its colour is milk-white to pale ochre, yellow at the summit. The shell consists of five whorls. The first three are turbinate, the last two-thirds of the shell's total length. They are slightly inflated, contracted at the sutures and wound obliquely.

Sculpture: the top whorls are smooth, last two ornamented by fine flat-topped spiral riblets parted by shallow grooves of slightly greater breadth. The riblets are more crowded on the centre of the whorl. There are 20 on the last whorl and 10 on the antepenultimate whorl. Faint growth-striae cross riblets and grooves obliquely. The aperture is round, bevelled at the edge, and thickened within but not externally.

== Distribution ==
This marine species is endemic to Australia and occurs off Northern Territory, Western Australia and Queensland
