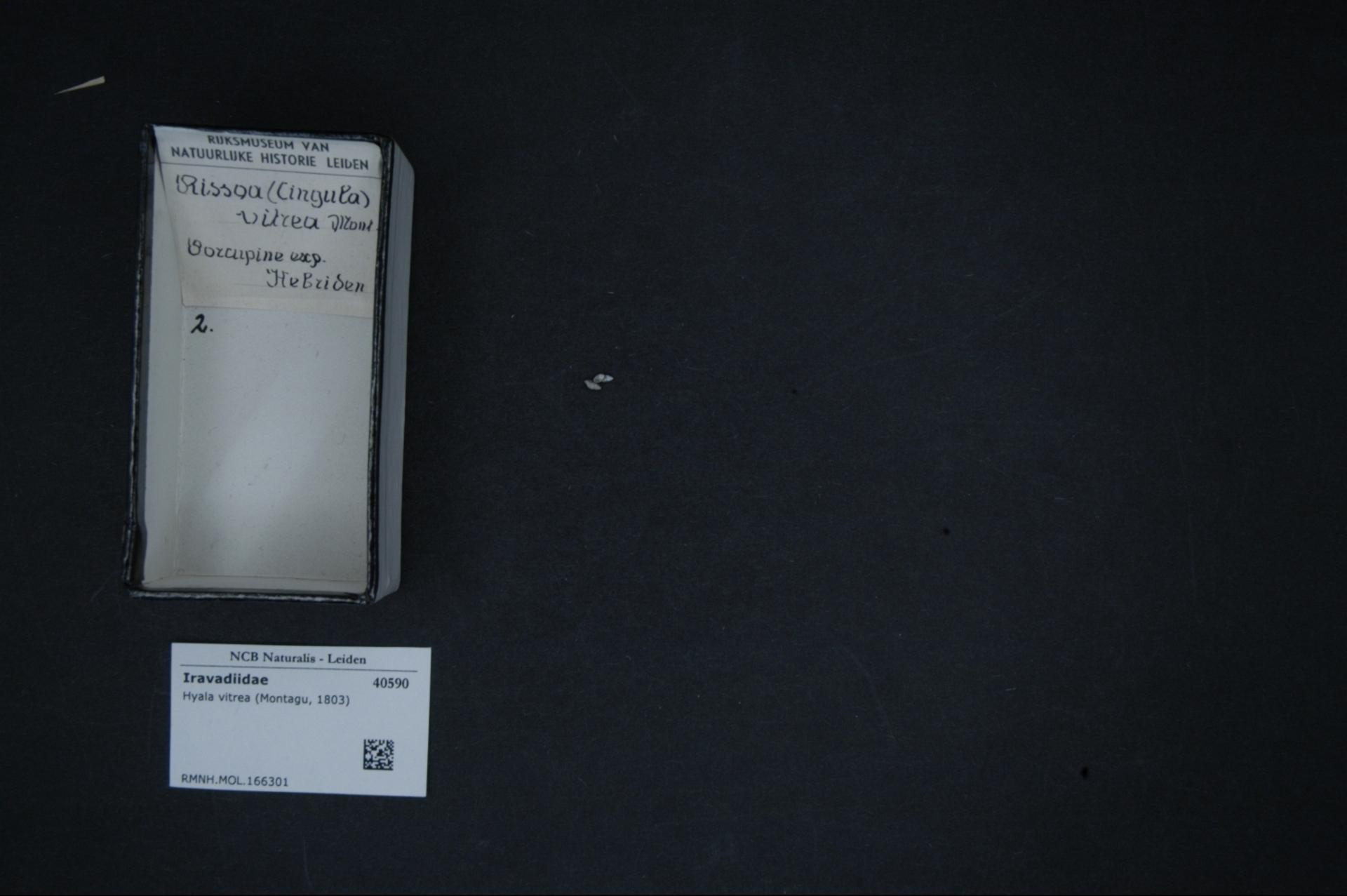
- Hyala vitrea (museum specimen at Naturalis Biodiversity Center)

Scientific classification
- Kingdom: Animalia
- Phylum: Mollusca
- Class: Gastropoda
- Subclass: Caenogastropoda
- Order: Littorinimorpha
- Family: Iravadiidae
- Genus: Hyala
- Species: H. vitrea

Binomial name
- Hyala vitrea (Montagu, 1803)

Synonyms
- Cingula vitrea (Montagu, 1803); Onoba vitrea (Montagu); Hyala glabrata Fleming, J., 1828; Turbo vitreus Montagu 1803 (basionym)

= Hyala vitrea =

Species of gastropod

Hyala vitrea is a species of small sea snail, a marine gastropod mollusk or micromollusk in the family Iravadiidae.

Previously, Hyala vitrea was considered as a species of Onoba (Rissoidae).

== Description ==
The shell size varies between 1 and 4 mm (0.039 and 0.157 in).

== Distribution ==
It is found in European waters, in the Mediterranean Sea and in the Black Sea.

== Ecology ==
The species is a grazer and deposit feeder.
