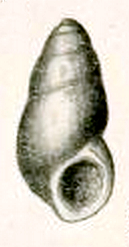
- Original drawing of a shell of Botelloides chrysalidus

Scientific classification
- Kingdom: Animalia
- Phylum: Mollusca
- Class: Gastropoda
- Subclass: Vetigastropoda
- Order: Trochida
- Superfamily: Trochoidea
- Family: Trochidae
- Genus: Botelloides
- Species: B. chrysalidus

Binomial name
- Botelloides chrysalidus (Chapman & Gabriel, 1914)

Synonyms
- Rissoa (Onoba) chrysalida Chapman & Gabriel, 1914

= Botelloides chrysalidus =

Species of gastropod

Botelloides chrysalidus is a species of sea snail, a marine gastropod mollusk in the family Trochidae, the top snails.

Subspecies

- Botelloides chrysalidus chrysalidus (Chapman & Gabriel, 1914) (synonym: Rissoa (Onoba) chrysalidus Chapman & Gabriel, 1914)
- Botelloides chrysalidus kendricki Ponder, 1985

== Description ==
The height of the shell attains 3.1 mm, its diameter 1.5 mm. The stoutly built and polished shell has a pupiform shape. The four whorls are depressed convex. The spiral and helicoid apex consists of 2½ turns. The shallow sutures are excavated. The circular aperture has a thick lip. There are faint colour bands parallel with and near to the sutures, as seen in some specimens. The surface shows, under a high magnification, fine growth lines.

== Distribution ==
This marine species is endemic to Australia and occurs off South Australia and Western Australia .
