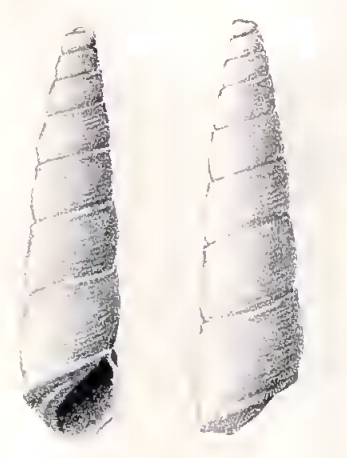
- Acliceratia beddomei

Scientific classification
- Kingdom: Animalia
- Phylum: Mollusca
- Class: Gastropoda
- Subclass: Caenogastropoda
- Order: Littorinimorpha
- Family: Iravadiidae
- Genus: Acliceratia; Ponder, 1984

= Acliceratia =

Genus of gastropods

Acliceratia is a genus of very small, somewhat amphibious land snails that have a gill and an operculum, semi-terrestrial gastropod mollusks or micromollusk in the family Iravadiidae.

These tiny snails live in damp habitat (under rotting vegetation) that is very close to the edge of the sea; they can tolerate being washed with saltwater during especially high tides. These snails are sometimes listed as land snails and at other times they are listed as marine snails.

== Species ==
Species within the genus Acliceratia include:

- Acliceratia beddomei (Dautzenberg, 1912)
- Acliceratia carinata (Smith, 1871)
