= Onoba anderssoni =

Scientific classification
- Kingdom: Animalia
- Phylum: Mollusca
- Class: Gastropoda
- Subclass: Caenogastropoda
- Order: Littorinimorpha
- Family: Rissoidae
- Genus: Onoba
- Species: O. anderssoni

Binomial name
- Onoba anderssoni (Strebel, 1908)

Synonyms
- Rissoia anderssoni Strebel, 1908 (original combination)

Species of gastropod

Onoba anderssoni is a species of minute sea snail, a marine gastropod mollusk or micromollusk in the family Rissoidae.

== Description ==
The maximum recorded shell length is 1.67 mm.

== Habitat ==
Minimum recorded depth is 12 m. Maximum recorded depth is 15 m.
