= Onoba delecta =

Scientific classification
- Kingdom: Animalia
- Phylum: Mollusca
- Class: Gastropoda
- Subclass: Caenogastropoda
- Order: Littorinimorpha
- Family: Rissoidae
- Genus: Onoba
- Species: O. delecta

Binomial name
- Onoba delecta Ponder, 1983

Species of gastropod

Onoba delecta is a species of small sea snail, a marine gastropod mollusk or micromollusk in the family Rissoidae.

== Description ==
The maximum recorded shell length is 2.47 mm.

== Habitat ==
Minimum recorded depth is 40 m. Maximum recorded depth is 256 m.
