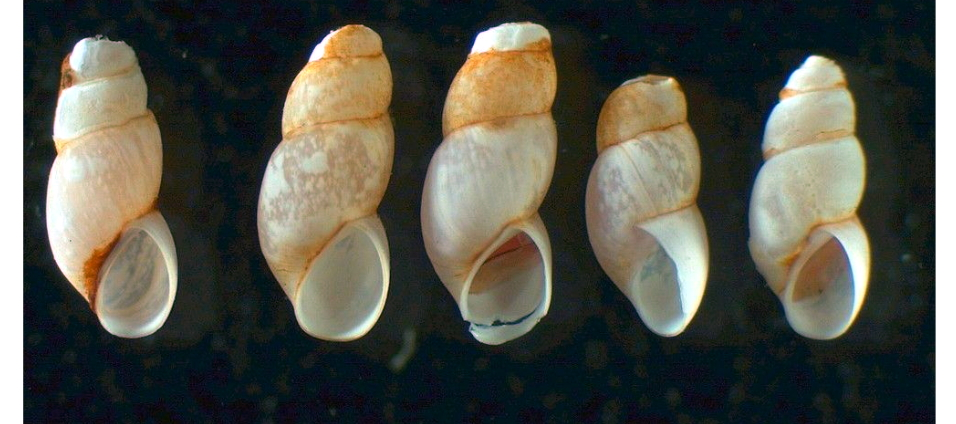
- Shells of Hyala vitrea (Montagu, 1803)

Scientific classification
- Kingdom: Animalia
- Phylum: Mollusca
- Class: Gastropoda
- Subclass: Caenogastropoda
- Order: Littorinimorpha
- Family: Iravadiidae
- Genus: Hyala; H. Adams & A. Adams, 1852

Type species
- Turbo vitreus Montagu, 1803

= Hyala =

Genus of gastropods

Hyala is a genus of very small, somewhat amphibious land snails that have a gill and an operculum, semi-terrestrial gastropod mollusks or micromollusks belonging to the family Iravadiidae.

== Description ==
(Original description) The head of the animal is elongated and emarginate at the tip, forming two distinct lobes. The tentacles are flattened, lacking a club-shaped tip, and possess fine setae at their extremities. The eyes are sessile and located centrally on the base of each tentacle. The foot is simple posteriorly. The opercular lobe lacks a caudal cirrus. The shell is hyaline (transparent).

They are subsurface deposit feeders.

== Species ==
Species within the genus Hyala include:

- Hyala adamsi Golikov & Kussakin in Golikov & Scarlato, 1971
- Hyala bella (A. Adams, 1853)
- † Hyala fragila Dockery, 1993
- Hyala vitrea (Montagu, 1803)

Species brought into synonymy

- † Hyala laevigatoidea Gründel, 1993: synonym ofs † Usedomella laevigatoidea (Gründel, 1993 (superseded combination)
- Hyala mediterranea F. Nordsieck, 1972: synonym of Hyala vitrea (Montagu, 1803)
- Hyala pumila A. Adams, 1870: synonym of Microdryas pumila (A. Adams, 1870) (superseded combination)
