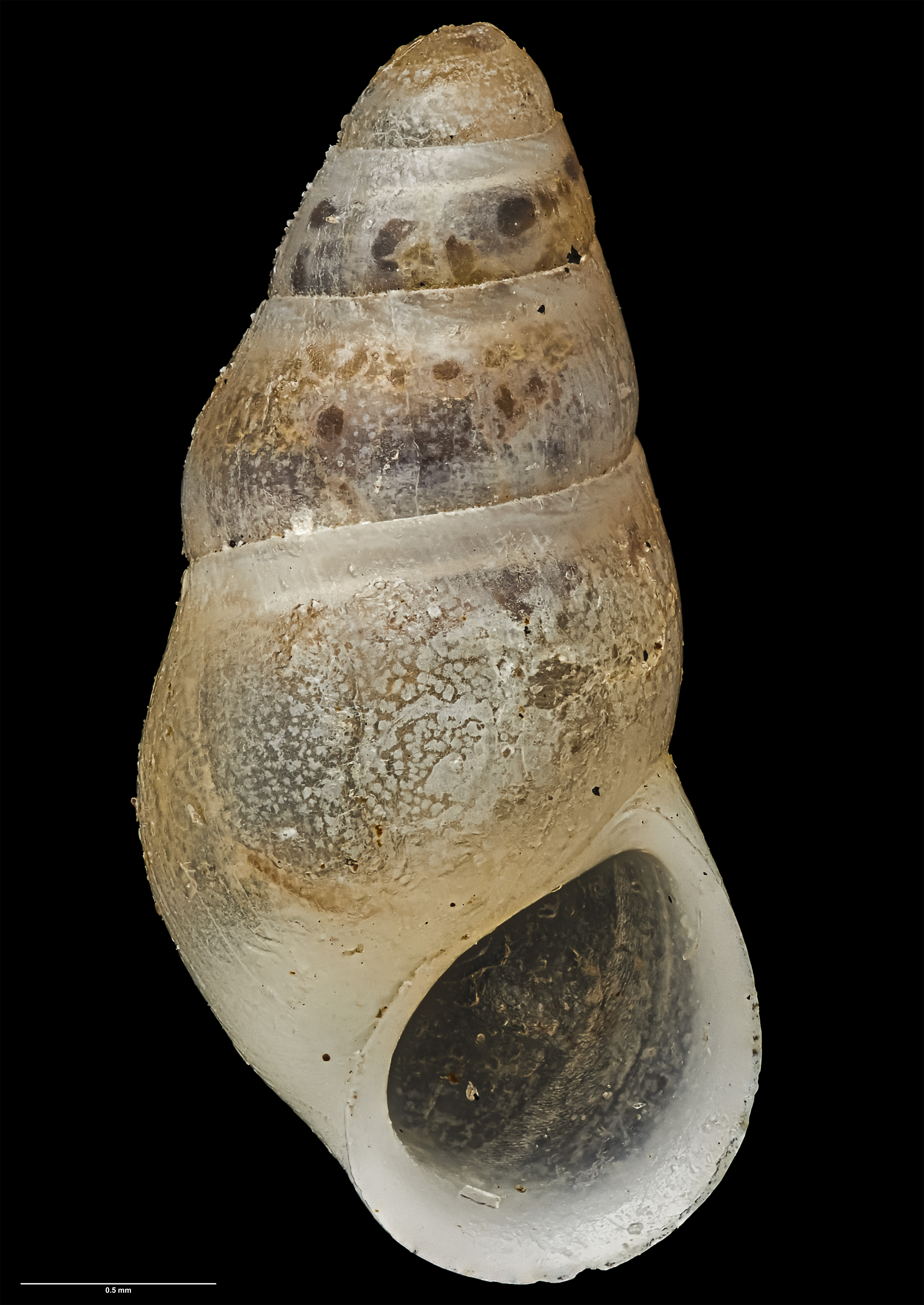
- Holotype of Onoba elegans from Auckland War Memorial Museum

Scientific classification
- Domain: Eukaryota
- Kingdom: Animalia
- Phylum: Mollusca
- Class: Gastropoda
- Subclass: Caenogastropoda
- Order: Littorinimorpha
- Family: Rissoidae
- Genus: Onoba
- Species: O. elegans

Binomial name
- Onoba elegans (Ponder, 1965)

Synonyms
- Onoba (Ovirissoa) elegans Ponder, 1965; Rissopsis (Peringiella) elegans Ponder, 1965

= Onoba elegans =

Species of gastropod

Onoba elegans is a species of marine gastropod mollusc in the family Rissoidae. First described by Winston Ponder in 1965, it is endemic to the waters of New Zealand.

== Description ==
Onoba elegans has an ovate shell, with a tall spire and five whorls. The species measures 3.1mm by 2.15mm. The animal is yellowish-white in colour, with short cephalic tentacles.

== Distribution ==
The species is endemic to New Zealand. The holotype was collected by K. Hipkins on 29 December 1953, from a depth of 40 metres, 0.8 km west of Stephenson Island in the Whangaroa Harbour, Northland Region. Specimens have been found on the east coast of the Northland Region, and the north-west and north of the Aupouri Peninsula.
