= Onoba egorovae =

Scientific classification
- Kingdom: Animalia
- Phylum: Mollusca
- Class: Gastropoda
- Subclass: Caenogastropoda
- Order: Littorinimorpha
- Family: Rissoidae
- Genus: Onoba
- Species: O. egorovae

Binomial name
- Onoba egorovae Numanami, 1996

Species of gastropod

Onoba egorovae is a species of minute sea snail, a marine gastropod mollusk or micromollusk in the family Rissoidae.
