= Onoba moreleti =

Scientific classification
- Kingdom: Animalia
- Phylum: Mollusca
- Class: Gastropoda
- Subclass: Caenogastropoda
- Order: Littorinimorpha
- Family: Rissoidae
- Genus: Onoba
- Species: O. moreleti

Binomial name
- Onoba moreleti Dautzenberg, 1889

Species of gastropod

Onoba moreleti is a species of minute sea snail, a marine gastropod mollusc or micromollusk in the family Rissoidae.
