= Rissopsis =

Scientific classification
- Kingdom: Animalia
- Phylum: Mollusca
- Class: Gastropoda
- Subclass: Caenogastropoda
- Order: Littorinimorpha
- Family: Iravadiidae
- Genus: Rissopsis; Garrett, 1873

Type species
- Rissopsis typica Garrett, 1873

Genus of gastropods

Rissopsis is a genus of very small, somewhat amphibious land snails that have a gill and an operculum, semi-terrestrial gastropod mollusks or micromollusk in the family Iravadiidae.

== Species ==
Species within the genus Rissopsis include:

- Rissopsis prolongata (Turton, 1932)
- Rissopsis tuba Kilburn, 1977
- Rissopsis typica Garrett, 1873

Species brought into synonymy

- Rissopsis brevis May, 1919: synonym of Austrorissopsis consobrina (Tate & May, 1900)
- Rissopsis expansa Powell, 1930: synonym of Eusetia expansa (Powell, 1930)
- Rissopsis ligula Kilburn, 1975: synonym of Rissopsis prolongata (Turton, 1932)
