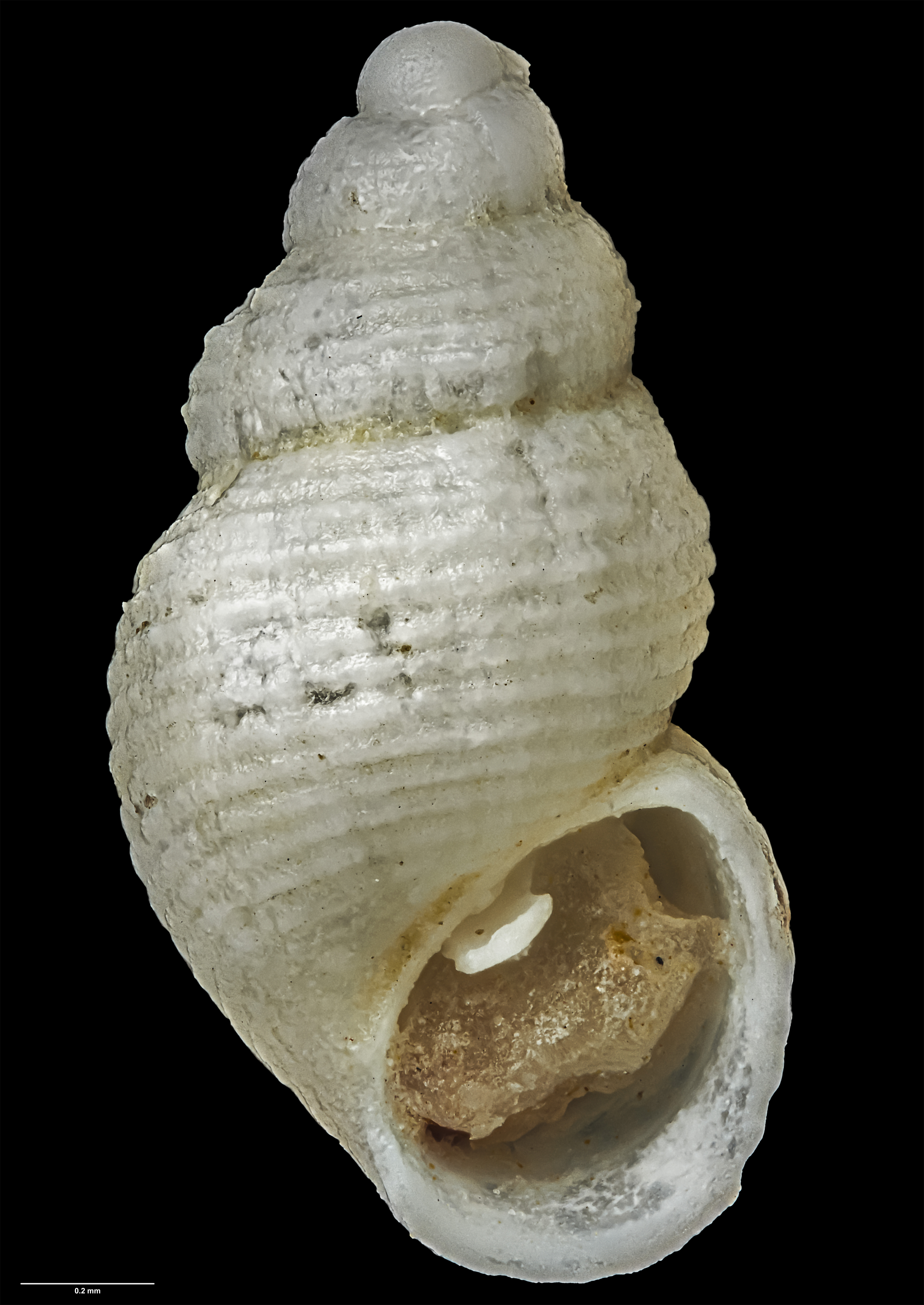
- Holotype from the Auckland War Memorial Museum

Scientific classification
- Kingdom: Animalia
- Phylum: Mollusca
- Class: Gastropoda
- Subclass: Caenogastropoda
- Order: Littorinimorpha
- Superfamily: Rissooidea
- Family: Rissoidae
- Genus: Subonoba
- Species: S. morioria

Binomial name
- Subonoba morioria A. W. B. Powell, 1933

Synonyms
- Onoba morioria (Powell, 1933); Onoba (Onoba) morioria (Powell, 1933)

= Subonoba morioria =

Species of sea snail

Subonoba morioria is a species of sea snail, a marine gastropod mollusc in the family Rissoidae. It is endemic to the waters surrounding the Chatham Islands of New Zealand.

== Description ==
In the original description, Powell described the species as follows:

Shell small, ovate, thin, fragile, white and translucent. Whorls 4 1/2, including a bluntly rounded protoconch of 1 1/2 smooth whorls. Spire tall, about l1/4 times height of aperture. The sculpture consists of numerous fine and closely spaced spiral lirae, 9 on the penultimate whorl, and 14 on the body-whorl and base. The interspaces are mostly about half the width of the lirae, but those near to the upper suture are wider and equal to the width of the lirae. Aperture ovate, peristome continuous. Outer-lip with a shallow sinus above and inclined forwards slightly below.

The shells of the species measure 1.9 mm (0.075 in) in height and 1.0 mm (0.039 in) in diameter. It differs from S. foveauxiana in shape, and from S. fumata by having stronger spirals, a shorter spire, and a more inflated body-whorl (nine on the penultimate and 14 across the body-whorl and base).

== Taxonomy ==
The species was first described by A. W. B. Powell in 1933. In 1995, Hamish Spencer and Richard C. Willan recombined the species as Onoba morioria. While this remains the preferred name by the New Zealand Organisms Register, the original combination, S. morioria, is the preferred name by the World Register of Marine Species and The Marine Biota of Aotearoa New Zealand (2023).

The holotype was collected by Powell himself in February 1933, from shell sand at Waitangi in the Chatham Islands. The holotype is held by the Auckland War Memorial Museum.

== Distribution and habitat ==
S. morioria is endemic to New Zealand, found only in the waters of the Chatham Islands.
