= Onoba gigas =

Scientific classification
- Kingdom: Animalia
- Phylum: Mollusca
- Class: Gastropoda
- Subclass: Caenogastropoda
- Order: Littorinimorpha
- Family: Rissoidae
- Genus: Onoba
- Species: O. gigas

Binomial name
- Onoba gigas Bozzetti, 2008

Species of gastropod

Onoba gigas is a species of small sea snail, a marine gastropod mollusk or micromollusk in the family Rissoidae.
