= Frigidoalvania cruenta =

Scientific classification
- Kingdom: Animalia
- Phylum: Mollusca
- Class: Gastropoda
- Subclass: Caenogastropoda
- Order: Littorinimorpha
- Family: Rissoidae
- Genus: Frigidoalvania
- Species: F. cruenta

Binomial name
- Frigidoalvania cruenta (Odhner, 1915)

Species of gastropod

Frigidoalvania cruenta is a species of small sea snail, a marine gastropod mollusc or micromollusc in the family Rissoidae.
