= Frigidoalvania brychia =

Scientific classification
- Kingdom: Animalia
- Phylum: Mollusca
- Class: Gastropoda
- Subclass: Caenogastropoda
- Order: Littorinimorpha
- Family: Rissoidae
- Genus: Frigidoalvania
- Species: F. brychia

Binomial name
- Frigidoalvania brychia (A. E. Verrill, 1884)

Species of gastropod

Frigidoalvania brychia is a species of minute sea snail, a marine gastropod mollusc or micromollusc in the family Rissoidae.

== Distribution ==
The species has been reported from Saguenay Fjord and Gulf of Saint Lawrence in Canada as well as the Gulf of Maine in the North Atlantic Ocean.

== Description ==
The maximum recorded shell length is 5 mm.

== Habitat ==
Minimum recorded depth is 186 m. Maximum recorded depth is 2359 m.
