= Onoba nunezi =

Scientific classification
- Kingdom: Animalia
- Phylum: Mollusca
- Class: Gastropoda
- Subclass: Caenogastropoda
- Order: Littorinimorpha
- Family: Rissoidae
- Genus: Onoba
- Species: O. nunezi

Binomial name
- Onoba nunezi Rolán & Hernández, 2004

Species of gastropod

Onoba nunezi is a species of small sea snail, a marine gastropod mollusk or micromollusk in the family Rissoidae.The scientific name of the species was first published in 2004 by Rolán and Hernandez, after the malacologist Carlos Núñez Cortés.
