= Onoba obliqua =

Scientific classification
- Kingdom: Animalia
- Phylum: Mollusca
- Class: Gastropoda
- Subclass: Caenogastropoda
- Order: Littorinimorpha
- Family: Rissoidae
- Genus: Onoba
- Species: O. obliqua

Binomial name
- Onoba obliqua (Warén, 1974)

Synonyms
- Alvania obliqua Warén, 1974

Species of gastropod

Onoba obliqua is a species of small sea snail, a marine gastropod mollusk or micromollusk in the family Rissoidae.

== Description ==
The maximum recorded shell length is 3.9 mm.

== Habitat ==
Minimum recorded depth is 63 m. Maximum recorded depth is 686 m.
