= Nozeba =

Scientific classification
- Kingdom: Animalia
- Phylum: Mollusca
- Class: Gastropoda
- Subclass: Caenogastropoda
- Order: Littorinimorpha
- Family: Iravadiidae
- Genus: Nozeba; Iredale, 1915

Type species
- Rissoa emarginata Hutton, 1885

Synonyms
- Syntharella Laseron, 1955

Genus of gastropods

Nozeba is a genus of very small, somewhat amphibious land snails that have a gill and an operculum, semi-terrestrial gastropod mollusks or micromollusk in the family Iravadiidae.

== Species ==
Species within the genus Nozeba include:

- † Nozeba berellensis (de Laubrière & Carez, 1881)
- † Nozeba candida H. J. Finlay, 1924
- † Nozeba capillaris (Gougerot & Le Renard, 1977)
- † Nozeba couttsi Laws, 1950
- † Nozeba crassa Dockery, 1993
- † Nozeba crassioris (Gougerot & Le Renard, 1977)
- Nozeba emarginata (Hutton, 1885)
- † Nozeba eulimoides (Cossmann, 1888)
- † Nozeba gatliffiana (Chapman & Gabriel, 1914)
- Nozeba lignicola Hasegawa, 1997
- † Nozeba lubricella (A. Braun, 1851)
- † Nozeba lucida (Cossmann, 1886)
- † Nozeba macera (Cossmann, 1899)
- Nozeba mica H. J. Finlay, 1930
- † Nozeba nervii Pacaud, 2025
- † Nozeba obesula (Gougerot & Le Renard, 1978)
- † Nozeba pasitheolina Lozouet, 1998
- † Nozeba perpava Laws, 1939
- † Nozeba plana Laws, 1940
- † Nozeba pourcyensis (Staadt, 1913)

† Nozeba pygmaea (Cossmann, 1888)

- Nozeba striata Ponder, 1984
- Nozeba topaziaca (Hedley, 1908)
- † Nozeba vitrea (Le Renard, 1996)
- Nozeba ziczac (H. Fukuda & Ekawa, 1997)

Species brought into synonymy

- † Nozeba fragilis (Deshayes, 1861): synonym of † Antinodulus fragilis (Deshayes, 1861) (superseded combination)
- † Nozeba globulus (Grateloup, 1828): synonym of † Nozeba subglobulus (A. d'Orbigny, 1852): synonym of † Antinodulus subglobulus (A. d'Orbigny, 1852) (junior homonym)
- † Nozeba subglobulus (A. d'Orbigny, 1852): synonym of † Antinodulus subglobulus (A. d'Orbigny, 1852) (superseded combination)
