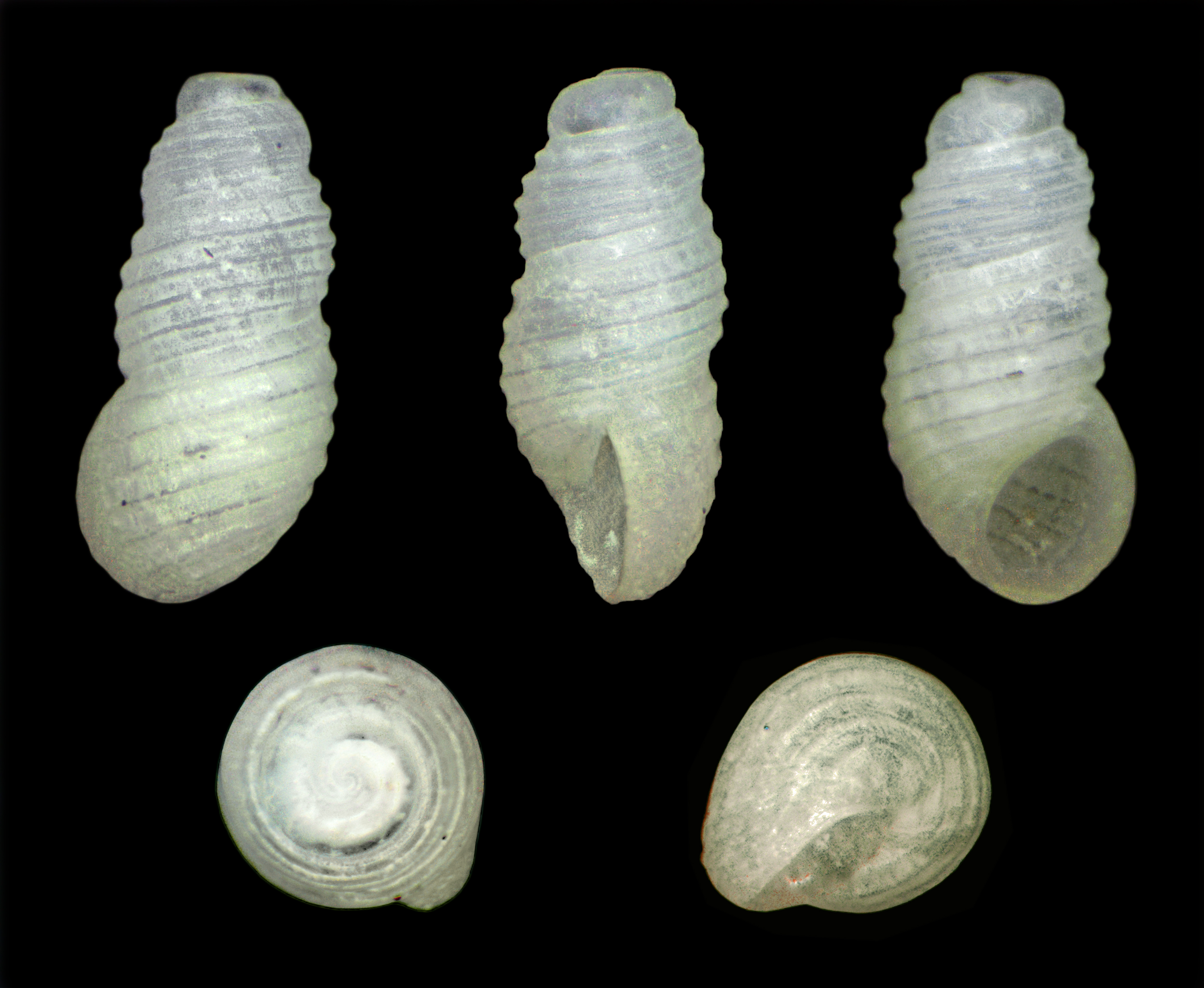
- Liroceratia sulcata (Boettger, 1893)

Scientific classification
- Kingdom: Animalia
- Phylum: Mollusca
- Class: Gastropoda
- Subclass: Caenogastropoda
- Order: Littorinimorpha
- Family: Iravadiidae
- Genus: Liroceratia; Ponder, 1984

Type species
- Cingula sulcata O. Boettger, 1893

= Liroceratia =

Genus of gastropods

Liroceratia is a genus of very small, somewhat amphibious land snails that have a gill and an operculum, semi-terrestrial gastropod mollusks or micromollusk in the family Iravadiidae.

== Species ==
Species within the genus Liroceratia include:

- Liroceratia sulcata (Boettger, 1893)
- Liroceratia truncata (Garrett, 1873) (accepted > unreplaced junior homonym, name preoccupied by Rissoa truncata Menke, 1828)
