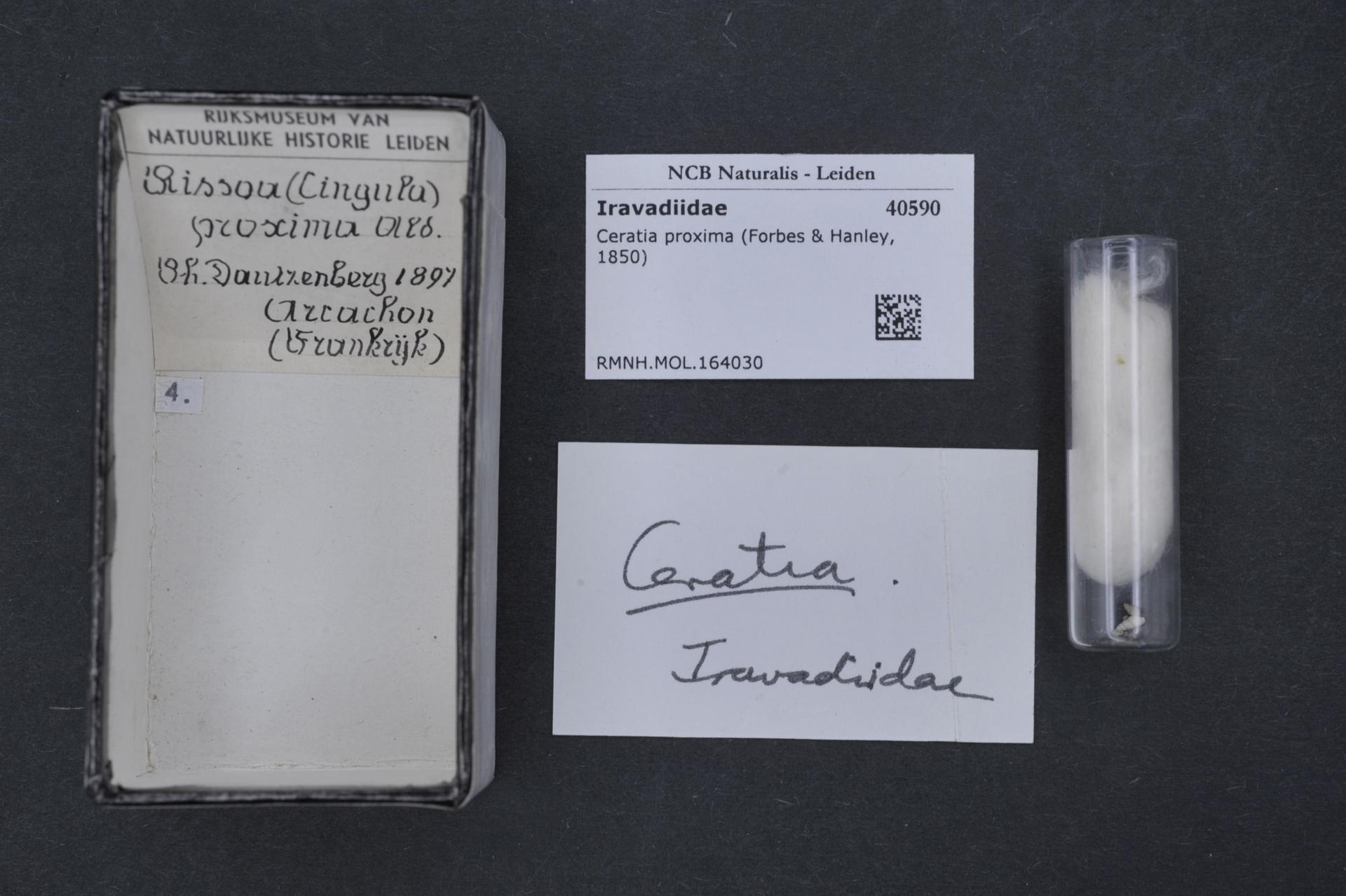
- Ceratia proxima shells

Scientific classification
- Kingdom: Animalia
- Phylum: Mollusca
- Class: Gastropoda
- Subclass: Caenogastropoda
- Order: Littorinimorpha
- Family: Iravadiidae
- Genus: Ceratia; H. Adams & A. Adams, 1852

= Ceratia =

Genus of gastropods

Ceratia is a genus of sea snails, marine gastropod mollusks the family Iravadiidae.

== Species ==
Species within the genus Ceratia include:

- † Ceratia dissoluta Weichmann, 1874
- † Ceratia dufresnoyi (Des Moulins, 1868) - synonym: Ceratia suturalis Cossmann & Peyrot, 1919
- Ceratia francisca Lima, Júnior, Guimarães & Dominguez, 2016
- † Ceratia meridionalis Lozouet, 2015
- Ceratia nagashima Fukuda, 2000
- Ceratia pachia (Watson, 1886)
- † Ceratia pliocenica Ceregato & Tabanelli, 2005
- Ceratia proxima (Forbes & Hanley, 1850) - type species of the genus Ceratia, synonym: Ceratia altimirai Nordsieck, 1982
- Ceratia sergipana Lima, Júnior, Guimarães & Dominguez, 2016
- † Ceratia sternbergensis R. Janssen, 1978

Synonyms

- Ceratia watsoni Hornung & Mermod, 1927 is a synonym of Monotygma watsoni (Hornung & Mermod, 1927)
