= Frigidoalvania thalassae =

Scientific classification
- Kingdom: Animalia
- Phylum: Mollusca
- Class: Gastropoda
- Subclass: Caenogastropoda
- Order: Littorinimorpha
- Family: Rissoidae
- Genus: Frigidoalvania
- Species: F. thalassae

Binomial name
- Frigidoalvania thalassae Bouchet & Warén, 1993

Species of gastropod

Frigidoalvania thalassae is a species of minute sea snail, a marine gastropod mollusc or micromollusc in the family Rissoidae.
