= Frigidoalvania flavida =

Scientific classification
- Kingdom: Animalia
- Phylum: Mollusca
- Class: Gastropoda
- Subclass: Caenogastropoda
- Order: Littorinimorpha
- Family: Rissoidae
- Genus: Frigidoalvania
- Species: F. flavida

Binomial name
- Frigidoalvania flavida Golikov & Sirenko, 1998

Species of gastropod

Frigidoalvania flavida is a species of minute sea snail, a marine gastropod mollusc or micromollusc in the family Rissoidae.
