= Chevallieria =

Scientific classification
- Kingdom: Animalia
- Phylum: Mollusca
- Class: Gastropoda
- Subclass: Caenogastropoda
- Order: Littorinimorpha
- Family: Iravadiidae
- Genus: Chevallieria; Cossmann, 1888

Type species
- † Chevallieria labrosa Cossmann, 1888

Synonyms
- Nanadoma Laseron, 1956 ·

Genus of gastropods

Chevallieria is a genus of minute sea snails, marine gastropod mollusks or micromollusks in the family Anabathridae.

== Description ==
(Original description in French) The shell is imperforate and subcylindrical, featuring a spire truncated at the apex and spirally striated whorls. The aperture is oval, subtrigonal, and vertical, broadly emarginate anteriorly. The peristome is entire and callous, forming an angle at the junction of the columella.

== Species ==
- Chevallieria australis Ponder, 1984
- † Chevallieria balcombensis Ponder, 1984
- Chevallieria columen (Melvill, 1904)
- † Chevallieria cylindroides Cossmann, 1907
- † Chevallieria fossilis (H. J. Finlay, 1924)
- † Chevallieria gippslandica Ponder, 1984
- Chevallieria imitoris (Laseron, 1956)
- † Chevallieria labrosa Cossmann, 1888
- † Chevallieria microtumida Lozouet, 1999
- † Chevallieria minuta (Deshayes, 1861)
- † Chevallieria mumiola Cossmann, 1888
- † Chevallieria pakaurangia (Laws, 1944)
- † Chevallieria pissarroi Cossmann, 1900
- † Chevallieria pseudoproxima (A. W. Janssen, 1967)
- † Chevallieria resecta Cossmann, 1892
- † Chevallieria stampinensis Lozouet, 2015
- † Chevallieria waitotarana (Laws, 1940)
