= Onoba leptalea =

Scientific classification
- Kingdom: Animalia
- Phylum: Mollusca
- Class: Gastropoda
- Subclass: Caenogastropoda
- Order: Littorinimorpha
- Family: Rissoidae
- Genus: Onoba
- Species: O. leptalea

Binomial name
- Onoba leptalea (Verrill, 1884)

Species of gastropod

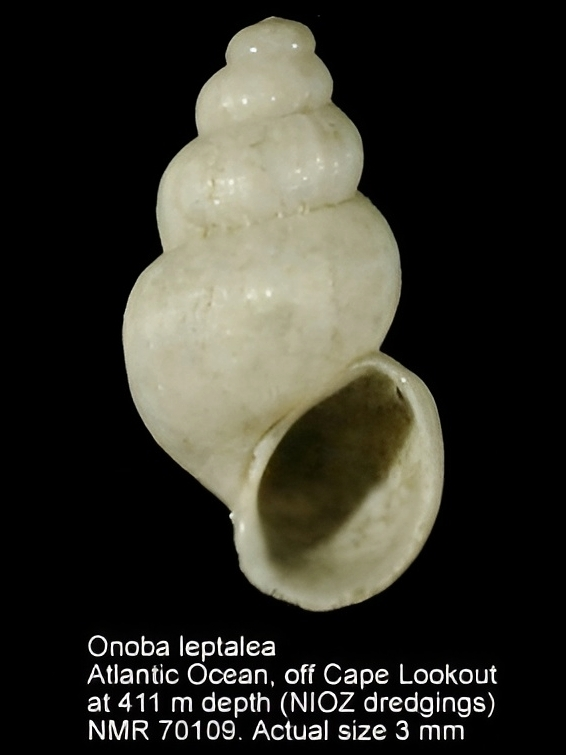
Shell of Onoba leptalea

Onoba leptalea is a species of small sea snail, a marine gastropod mollusk or micromollusk in the family Rissoidae.

== Description ==
The maximum recorded shell length is 3 mm.

== Habitat ==
Minimum recorded depth is 50 m. Maximum recorded depth is 1836 m.
