= Frigidoalvania janmayeni =

Scientific classification
- Kingdom: Animalia
- Phylum: Mollusca
- Class: Gastropoda
- Subclass: Caenogastropoda
- Order: Littorinimorpha
- Family: Rissoidae
- Genus: Frigidoalvania
- Species: F. janmayeni

Binomial name
- Frigidoalvania janmayeni (Friele, 1878)

Synonyms
- Alvania janmayeni

Species of gastropod

Frigidoalvania janmayeni is a species of minute sea snail, a marine gastropod mollusk or micromollusk in the family Rissoidae.

== Description ==
The maximum recorded shell length is 5.7 mm.

== Habitat ==
Minimum recorded depth is 8 m. Maximum recorded depth is 931 m.
