= Frigidoalvania =

Scientific classification
- Kingdom: Animalia
- Phylum: Mollusca
- Class: Gastropoda
- Subclass: Caenogastropoda
- Order: Littorinimorpha
- Family: Rissoidae
- Genus: Frigidoalvania; Warén, 1974

Genus of gastropods

Frigidoalvania is a genus of minute sea snails, marine gastropod mollusks or micromollusks in the family Rissoidae.

== Species ==
Species within the genus Frigidoalvania include:

- Frigidoalvania brychia (A. E. Verrill, 1884)
- Frigidoalvania cruenta (Odhner, 1915)
- Frigidoalvania flavida Golikov & Sirenko, 1998
- Frigidoalvania janmayeni (Friele, 1878)
- Frigidoalvania pelagica (Stimpson, 1851)
- Frigidoalvania thalassae Bouchet & Warén, 1993
