= Botelloides sulcatus =

Scientific classification
- Kingdom: Animalia
- Phylum: Mollusca
- Class: Gastropoda
- Subclass: Vetigastropoda
- Order: Trochida
- Superfamily: Trochoidea
- Family: Trochidae
- Genus: Botelloides
- Species: B. sulcatus

Binomial name
- Botelloides sulcatus (Cotton, 1944)

Synonyms
- Lironoba sulcata Cotton, 1944

Species of gastropod

Botelloides sulcatus is a species of sea snail, a marine gastropod mollusk in the family Trochidae, the top snails.

== Distribution ==
This marine species is endemic to Australia and occurs off South Australia, Tasmania and Western Australia; in the Arafura Sea.
