= Onoba filostria =

Scientific classification
- Kingdom: Animalia
- Phylum: Mollusca
- Class: Gastropoda
- Subclass: Caenogastropoda
- Order: Littorinimorpha
- Family: Rissoidae
- Genus: Onoba
- Species: O. filostria

Binomial name
- Onoba filostria (Melvill & Standen, 1912)

Species of gastropod

Onoba filostria is a species of small sea snail, a marine gastropod mollusk or micromollusk in the family Rissoidae.

== Description ==
The maximum recorded shell length is 2.4 mm.

== Habitat ==
Minimum recorded depth is 16 m. Maximum recorded depth is 18 m.
