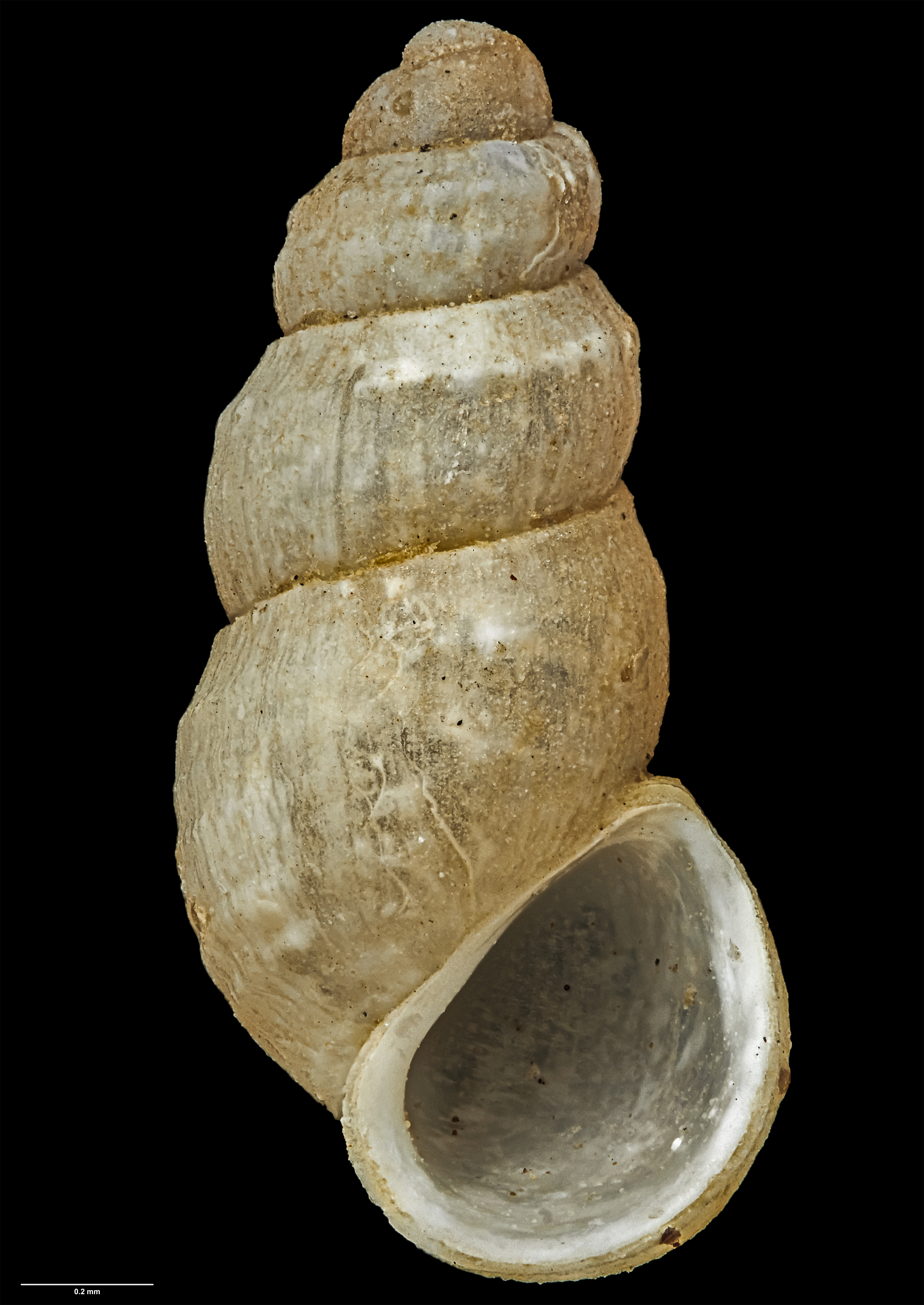
- Holotype from the Auckland War Memorial Museum

Scientific classification
- Kingdom: Animalia
- Phylum: Mollusca
- Class: Gastropoda
- Subclass: Caenogastropoda
- Order: Littorinimorpha
- Superfamily: Rissooidea
- Family: Rissoidae
- Genus: Subonoba
- Species: S. inornata

Binomial name
- Subonoba inornata A. W. B. Powell, 1933

Synonyms
- Onoba inornata (Powell, 1933); Onoba (Onoba) inornata (Powell, 1933)

= Subonoba inornata =

Species of sea snail

Subonoba inornata is a species of sea snail, a marine gastropod mollusc in the family Rissoidae. It is endemic to New Zealand, found in the southern South Island, the Chatham Islands, Snares Islands and Stewart Island.

== Description ==
In the original description, Powell described the species as follows:

Shell minute, subcylindrical, thin, coloured uniformly pale buff. Surface dull, smooth except for weak spiral lirae. Whorls 4 1/2, including bluntly rounded protoconch of 1 1/2 smooth whorls. Spire tall, about 1 1/2 times height of aperture. Post-nuclear whorls faintly angled at the upper third. Sculpture consisting of low, indistinct spiral lirae, five on the penultimate and eight on the body-whorl and base. The width of the interspaces is about equal to that of the liras. On the base the three spirals are grouped above, leaving the lower half smooth. Aperture large, oblique, ovate-pyriform. Peristome continuous. Outer-lip dilated oblique in profile with a shallow sinus above, and inclined forwards basally.

The shells of the species measure 1.92 mm (0.076 in) in height and 0.9 mm (0.035 in) in diameter. It can be differentiated from S. parvula due to its larger size, shouldered appearance and by having fewer spiral lirae, and identified due to its distinctly D-shaped large aperture.

== Taxonomy ==
The species was first described by A. W. B. Powell in 1933. In 1995, Hamish Spencer and Richard C. Willan recombined the species as Onoba inornata. While this remains the preferred name by the New Zealand Organisms Register, the original combination, S. inornata, is the preferred name by the World Register of Marine Species and The Marine Biota of Aotearoa New Zealand (2023). The holotype was collected by Powell himself in February 1933, from seaweed at Waitangi in the Chatham Islands, and is held by the Auckland War Memorial Museum.

== Distribution and habitat ==
S. inornata is endemic to New Zealand, found in the waters surrounding the South Island as far north as Banks Peninsula, Stewart Island, Snares Islands and the Chatham Islands, at depths between 0–33 m (0–108 ft). Previously, the species was thought to be endemic to the Chatham Islands.
