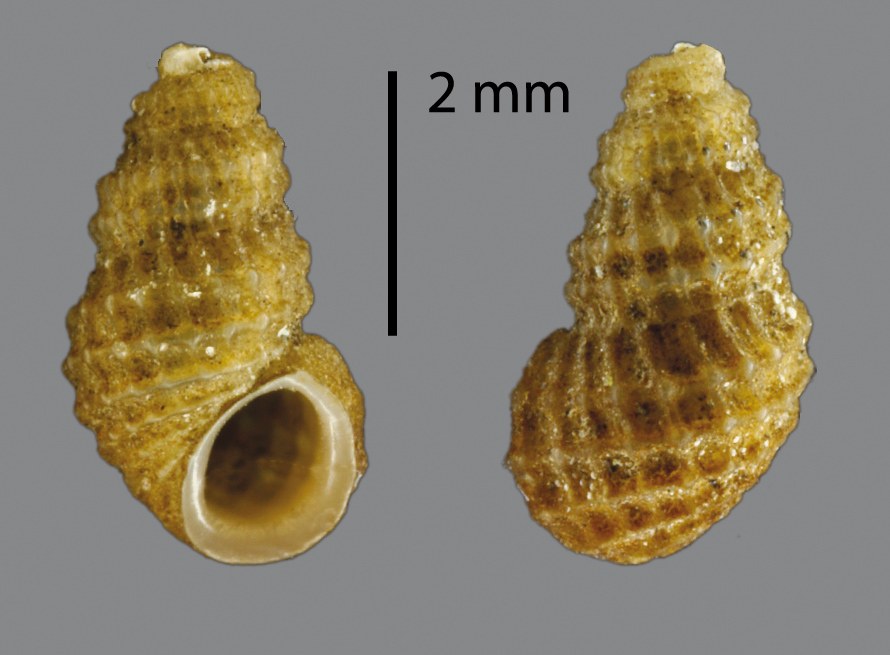
- Shell of Iravadia quadrasi (specimen at MNHN, Paris)

Scientific classification
- Kingdom: Animalia
- Phylum: Mollusca
- Class: Gastropoda
- Subclass: Caenogastropoda
- Order: Littorinimorpha
- Superfamily: Truncatelloidea
- Family: Iravadiidae
- Genus: Iravadia; Blanford, 1867

Type species
- Iravadia ornata Blanford, 1867

Synonyms
- Fairbankia Stoliczka, 1868; Iravadia (Fairbankia) Stoliczka, 1868; Iravadia (Iravadia) Blanford, 1867; Rissoina (Iravadia) W. T. Blandford, 1867

= Iravadia =

Genus of gastropods

Iravadia is a genus of very small, somewhat amphibious land snails that have a gill and an operculum, semi-terrestrial gastropod mollusks or micromollusk in the family Iravadiidae.

These tiny snails live in damp habitat (under rotting vegetation) that is very close to the edge of the sea; they can tolerate being washed with saltwater during especially high tides. These snails are listed as freshwater snails by Vaught (1989).

== Taxonomy ==
William Thomas Blanford established the genus Iravadia within the family Rissoidae in 1867.

== Species ==
Species within the genus Iravadia include:

- Iravadia angulata (Laseron, 1956)
- Iravadia bombayana (Stoliczka, 1868)
- Iravadia capitata (Laseron, 1956)
- Iravadia carpentariensis (Hedley, 1912)
- Iravadia cochinchinensis (Bavay & Dautzenberg, 1910)
- † Iravadia dolini Lozouet, 2003
- Iravadia elongata (Hornung & Mermod, 1928)
- Iravadia goliath (Laseron, 1956)
- Iravadia ornata Blanford, 1867 - type species of the genus Iravadia
- Iravadia pilbara Golding, 2014
- Iravadia quadrasi (O. Boettger, 1893)
- Iravadia quadrina (Laseron, 1956)
- Iravadia rohdei (Brandt, 1968)
- Iravadia tenella Bavay & Dautzenberg, 1912
- Iravadia tenuilirata (Boettger, 1893)

Species brought into synonymy

- Iravadia annandalei Preston, 1916: synonym of Iravadia ornata Blanford, 1867
- Iravadia aristaei (Melvill, 1912): synonym of Pseudonoba aristaei (Melvill, 1912)
- Iravadia atemeles (Melvill, 1912): synonym of Pseudonoba atemeles (Melvill, 1896)
- Iravadia australis Hedley, 1900: synonym of Pellamora australis (Hedley, 1901)
- Iravadia bella (A. Adams, 1853): synonym of Iravadia delicata (Philippi, 1849)
- Iravadia delicata (Philippi, 1849): synonym of Pseudonoba delicata (Philippi, 1849)
- Iravadia densilabrum (Melvill, 1912): synonym of Pellamora densilabrum (Melvill, 1912)
- Iravadia elegantula (A. Adams, 1861): synonym of Fluviocingula elegantula (A. Adams, 1861)
- Iravadia ennurensis Preston, 1916: synonym of Iravadia ornata Blanford, 1867
- Iravadia expansilabrum Ponder, 1984: synonym of Pseudonoba expansilabrum (Ponder, 1984) (original combination)
- Iravadia funerea Preston, 1916: synonym of Iravadia ornata Blanford, 1867
- Iravadia gemmata Ponder, 1984: synonym of Pseudonoba gemmata (Ponder, 1984)
- Iravadia ictriella (Melvill, 1910): synonym of Pseudonoba ictriella (Melvill, 1910)
- Iravadia inflata (Ponder, 1967): synonym of Pseudonoba inflata (Ponder, 1967)
- Iravadia mahimensis (Melvill, 1893): synonym of Pseudomerelina mahimensis (Melvill, 1893)
- Iravadia nipponica (Kuroda & Habe, 1954): synonym of Fluviocingula nipponica Kuroda & Habe, 1954
- Iravadia padangensis (Thiele, 1925): synonym of Pseudonoba padangensis (Thiele, 1925)
- Iravadia princeps Preston, 1915: synonym of Iravadia ornata Blanford, 1867
- Iravadia profundior Ponder, 1984: synonym of Pseudonoba profundior (Ponder, 1984) (originam combination)
- Iravadia resima (Laseron, 1956): synonym of Fluviocingula resima (Laseron, 1956)
- Iravadia reticulata Brandt, 1968: synonym of Iravadia quadrasi (O. Boettger, 1893)
- Iravadia sakaguchii (Kuroda & Habe, 1954): synonym of Wakauraia sakaguchii (Kuroda & Habe, 1954)
- Iravadia sublevis (Laseron, 1956): synonym of Pseudonoba sublevis (Laseron, 1956)
- Iravadia subquadrata (Laseron, 1950): synonym of Pseudonoba subquadrata (Laseron, 1950)
- Iravadia trochlearis (Gould, 1861): synonym of Stosicia annulata (Dunker, 1859)
- Iravadia tuberculata Brandt, 1974: synonym of Iravadia mahimensis (Melvill, 1893)
- Iravadia yendoi (Yokoyama, 1927): synonym of Pseudonoba yendoi (Yokoyama, 1927)
