= Onoba lincta =

Scientific classification
- Kingdom: Animalia
- Phylum: Mollusca
- Class: Gastropoda
- Subclass: Caenogastropoda
- Order: Littorinimorpha
- Family: Rissoidae
- Genus: Onoba
- Species: O. lincta

Binomial name
- Onoba lincta (Watson, 1873)

Species of gastropod

Onoba lincta is a species of small sea snail, a marine gastropod mollusk or micromollusk in the family Rissoidae.
