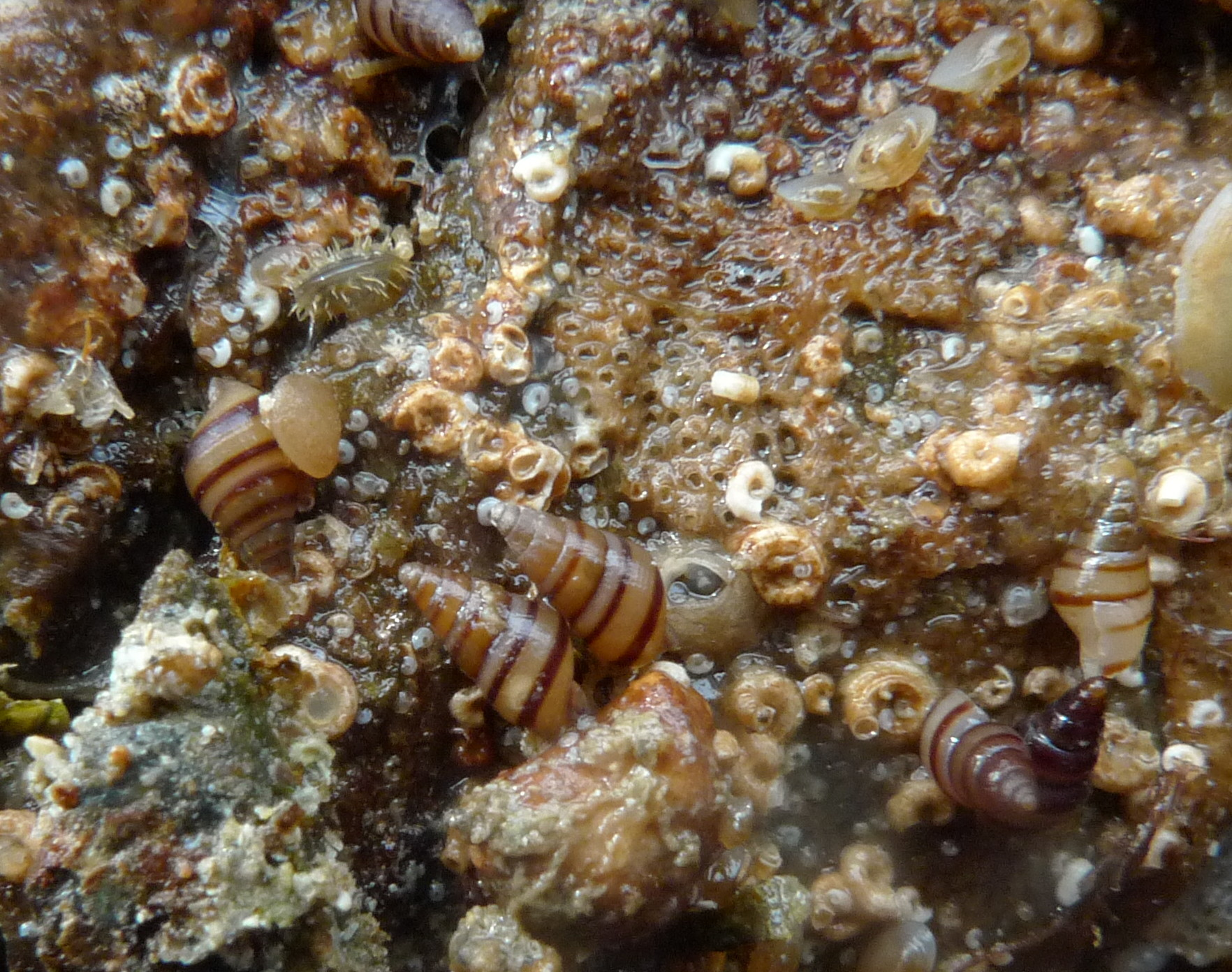

Scientific classification
- Kingdom: Animalia
- Phylum: Mollusca
- Class: Gastropoda
- Subclass: Caenogastropoda
- Order: Littorinimorpha
- Family: Rissoidae
- Genus: Cingula
- Species: C. trifasciata

Binomial name
- Cingula trifasciata (J. Adams, 1800)

Synonyms
- Cingula cingulus (Montagu, 1803); Cingula vittata Donovan, E., 1803; Eulima trifasciata (J. Adams, 1800); Rissoia cingillus (Montagu) (currently in genus Cingula); Turbo cingillus Montagu, 1803; Turbo trifasciata J. Adams, 1800 (basionym)

= Cingula trifasciata =

Species of gastropod

Cingula trifasciata is a species of sea snail, a marine gastropod mollusk or micromollusk in the family Rissoidae.

== Description ==
The length of an adult shell varies between 3 mm and 5 mm.

== Distribution ==
This species lives in the Atlantic Ocean from Norway to the Azores; in the Mediterranean Sea. The species C. trifasciata is however absent from the continental shores of the North Sea.
