= Botelloides ludbrookae =

Scientific classification
- Kingdom: Animalia
- Phylum: Mollusca
- Class: Gastropoda
- Subclass: Vetigastropoda
- Order: Trochida
- Superfamily: Trochoidea
- Family: Trochidae
- Genus: Botelloides
- Species: B. ludbrookae

Binomial name
- Botelloides ludbrookae Ponder, 1985

Species of gastropod

Botelloides ludbrookae is a species of sea snail, a marine gastropod mollusk in the family Trochidae, the top snails.

Subspecies

- Botelloides ludbrookae recens Ponder, 1985

== Distribution ==
This marine species is endemic to Australia and occurs off Western Australia.
