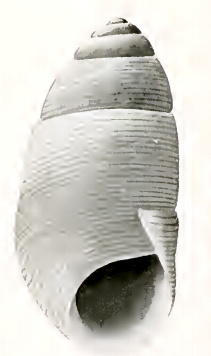
- Original drawing of a shell of Botelloides bassianus

Scientific classification
- Kingdom: Animalia
- Phylum: Mollusca
- Class: Gastropoda
- Subclass: Vetigastropoda
- Order: Trochida
- Superfamily: Trochoidea
- Family: Trochidae
- Genus: Botelloides; Strand, 1928

Type species
- Onoba bassiana Hedley, 1911

Synonyms
- Botellus Iredale, 1924 (Invalid: Junior homonym of Botellus Moniez, 1887)

= Botelloides =

Genus of gastropods

Botelloides is a genus of sea snails, marine gastropod mollusks in the family Trochidae, the top snails.

== Description ==
The general characteristics of the species in this genus are:

- the shell is subcylindrical and pupoid in shape
- the whorls wind obliquely on the last two-thirds of the shell
- sculpture: the earlier whorls are smooth, the later ones bear fine incised, spiral grooves
- the shape of the aperture is pyriform to circular
- the columella is excavate
- the outer lip is grooved within and bevelled to a sharp edge

Differences between the species are defined by the shell gradually widening towards the body whorl, or the shell not widening but is cylindrical.

== Distribution ==
The species in this marine genus are endemic to Australia and occurs off New South Wales, the Northern Territory, Queensland, South Australia, Tasmania, Victoria and Western Australia.

== Species ==
Species within the genus Botelloides include:

- Botelloides bassianus (Hedley, 1911)
- Botelloides chrysalidus (Chapman & Gabriel, 1914)
- Botelloides glomerosus (Hedley, 1907)
- Botelloides ludbrookae Ponder, 1985
- Botelloides sulcatus (Cotton, 1944)
