= Onoba torelli =

Scientific classification
- Kingdom: Animalia
- Phylum: Mollusca
- Class: Gastropoda
- Subclass: Caenogastropoda
- Order: Littorinimorpha
- Family: Rissoidae
- Genus: Onoba
- Species: O. torelli

Binomial name
- Onoba torelli (Warén, 1996)

Species of gastropod

Onoba torelli is a species of small sea snail, a marine gastropod mollusk or micromollusk in the family Rissoidae.

== Description ==
The maximum recorded shell length is 3.4 mm.

== Habitat ==
Minimum recorded depth is 18 m. Maximum recorded depth is 183 m.
