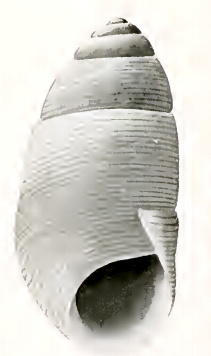
- Original drawing of a shell of Botelloides bassianus

Scientific classification
- Kingdom: Animalia
- Phylum: Mollusca
- Class: Gastropoda
- Subclass: Vetigastropoda
- Order: Trochida
- Superfamily: Trochoidea
- Family: Trochidae
- Genus: Botelloides
- Species: B. bassianus

Binomial name
- Botelloides bassianus (Hedley, 1911)

Synonyms
- Onoba bassiana Hedley, 1911

= Botelloides bassianus =

Species of gastropod

Botelloides bassianus is a species of sea snail, a marine gastropod mollusk in the family Trochidae, the top snails.

Subspecies

- Botelloides bassianus bassianus (Hedley, 1911) (synonyms: Rissoa (Onoba) glomerosa Gatliff & Gabriel, 1908; Rissoa (Onoba) bassiana Hedley, 1911)
- Botelloides bassianus borda Cotton, 1944 (synonym: Botelloides borda Cotton, 1944)

== Description ==
The height of the shell attains 4.5 mm, its diameter 2 mm. The solid, oblong shell has a subcylindrical shape. It is rounded at each extremity.

Colour: the upper part of each whorl is dull white, the lower slate-purple, the anterior extremity is again dull white, the dark band on the median third of the body whorl fading away before reaching the aperture. The apex is brown. The five whorls increase rapidly in size. They are wound obliquely the last two-thirds of the total length.

Sculpture : The earlier whorls are smooth, the later bear fine incised spiral grooves, of which the last has about thirty, the penultimate eighteen, and the antepenultimate twelve. Occasional growth striae cross the shell obliquely. The aperture is pyriform. The columella is excavate. The outer lip is grooved within and bevelled to a sharp edge.

The subspecies Botelloides bassianus borda differs by its cylindrical shell and the sides of the whorls that are rather flattened.

== Distribution ==
This marine species is endemic to Australia and occurs off New South Wales, South Australia, Tasmania, Victoria and Western Australia
