= Onoba mighelsii =

Scientific classification
- Kingdom: Animalia
- Phylum: Mollusca
- Class: Gastropoda
- Subclass: Caenogastropoda
- Order: Littorinimorpha
- Family: Rissoidae
- Genus: Onoba
- Species: O. mighelsii

Binomial name
- Onoba mighelsii (Stimpson, 1851)

Synonyms
- Alvania dinora Bartsch, 1917; Cingula alaskana Bartsch, 1912; Cingula arenaria auct. non Maton & Rackett, 1807

Species of gastropod

Onoba mighelsii is a species of minute sea snail, a marine gastropod mollusk or micromollusk in the family Rissoidae.

== Description ==
The maximum recorded shell length is 3.3 mm.

== Habitat ==
Minimum recorded depth is 4 m. Maximum recorded depth is 574 m.
