= Alvania cruzi =

Scientific classification
- Kingdom: Animalia
- Phylum: Mollusca
- Class: Gastropoda
- Subclass: Caenogastropoda
- Order: Littorinimorpha
- Superfamily: Rissooidea
- Family: Rissoidae
- Genus: Alvania
- Species: A. cruzi

Binomial name
- Alvania cruzi (Castellanos & D. E. Fernández, 1974)

Synonyms
- Onoba cruzi (Castellanos & D. E. Fernández, 1974); Rissoa cruzi Castellanos & D. E. Fernández, 1974 (original combination)

Species of gastropod

Alvania cruzi is a species of small sea snail, a marine gastropod mollusk or micromollusk in the family Rissoidae.

Originally described as Rissoa cruzi by Castellanos and Fernández in 1974, it was reclassified into the genus Alvania based on shell characteristics.

This species was first documented in southern Brazilian waters more than 35 years after its initial description.

== Description ==
The length of the shell varies between 2.2 mm and 3 mm.

== Distribution ==
This species occurs in the Atlantic Ocean off Southern Brazil.
