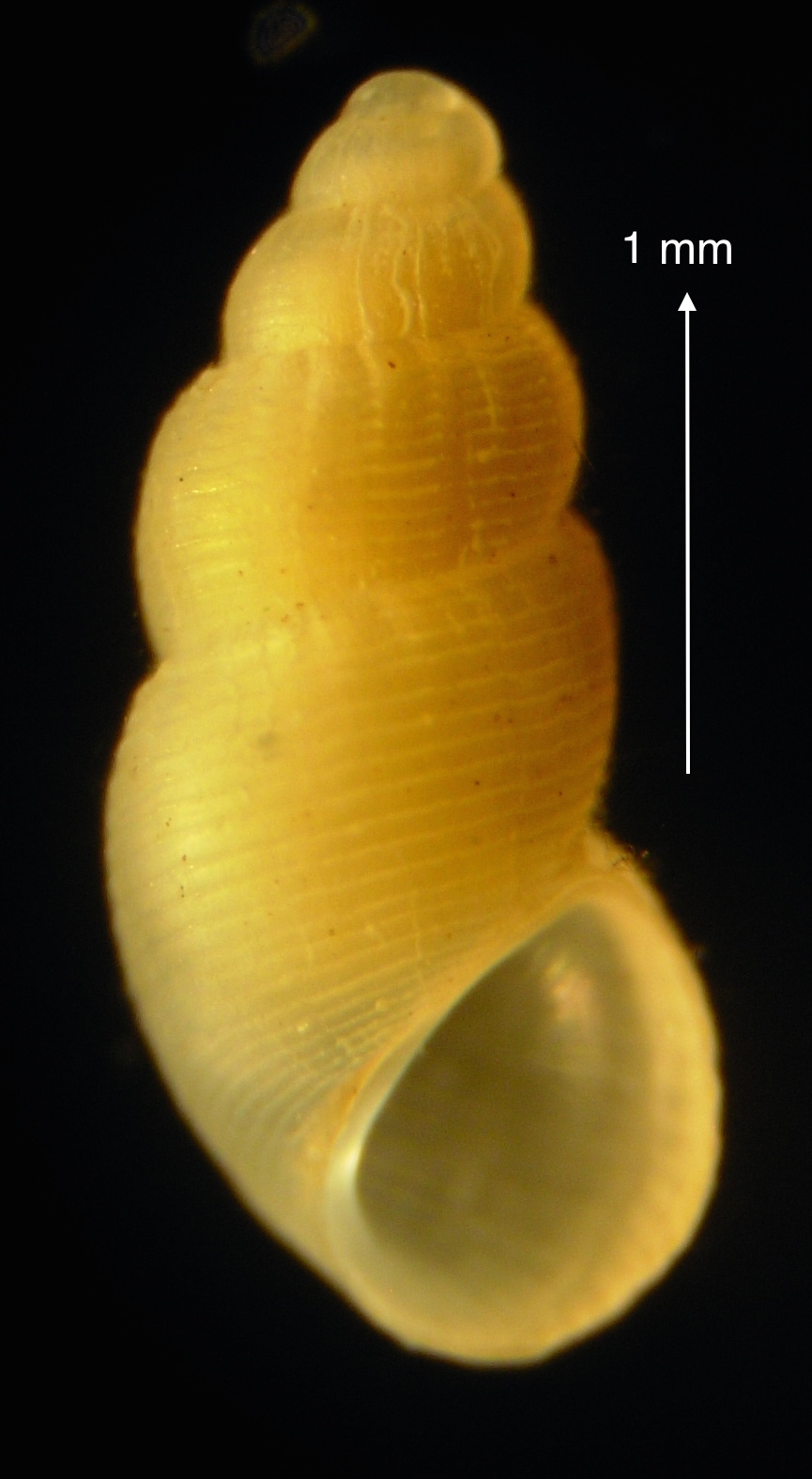

Scientific classification
- Kingdom: Animalia
- Phylum: Mollusca
- Class: Gastropoda
- Subclass: Caenogastropoda
- Order: Littorinimorpha
- Family: Rissoidae
- Genus: Onoba
- Species: O. semicostata

Binomial name
- Onoba semicostata (Montagu, 1803)

Synonyms
- Cingula semicostata (Montagu, 1803); Cingula striata (Adams, 1797) (nomen dubium); Odostomia marionae MacGillivray, 1843 (dubious synonym); Onoba candida (Brown, 1844); Onoba scotiana (Melvill & Standen, 1907); Onoba striata (J. Adams, 1797) (non da Costa, 1778); Pyramis candidus Brown, 1827 (dubious synonym); Pyramis decussatus Brown, 1827 (dubious synonym); Pyramis discors Brown, 1827 (dubious synonym); Rissoa communis Forbes, 1838 (dubious synonym); Rissoa ecostata Michaud, 1830; Rissoa gracilis MacGillivray, 1843; Rissoa minutissima Michaud, 1830; Rissoa peticularis Menke, 1830; Rissoa scotiana Melvill & Standen, 1907; Rissoa striata J. Adams, 1797; Rissoia scotiana Melvill & Standen, 1907; Turbo semicostatus Montagu, 1803 (original combination); Turbo shepeianus J. Adams, 1798; Turbo striatus J. Adams, 1797 (Invalid: junior secondary homonym of Rissoa striata Da Costa, 1778)

= Onoba semicostata =

Species of gastropod

Onoba semicostata is a species of minute sea snail, a marine gastropod mollusk or micromollusk in the family Rissoidae.

== Classification ==
Turbo semicostatus Montagu, 1803 is probably another species than those which is mostly understand by that name. According to Warén Turbo shepeianus could be the valid name for this species found off Belgium. Further research is necessary, therefore we use the more commonly used name Onoba semicostata.

== Taxonomy ==
Janssen (1975) mentioned two subspecies: O. s. semicostata and O. s. aculeus (Gould, 1841). Thorson (1941), Warén (1973, 1974) and Fretter & Graham (1978) are followed who both consider O. s. semicostata and O. s. aculeus as separate species.

== Distribution ==
This marine species occurs in the Baltic Sea, the North Sea, the Northern and Northeast Atlantic Ocean and in the Mediterranean Sea.
