= Subonoba ovata =

Scientific classification
- Kingdom: Animalia
- Phylum: Mollusca
- Class: Gastropoda
- Subclass: Caenogastropoda
- Order: Littorinimorpha
- Family: Rissoidae
- Genus: Subonoba
- Species: S. ovata

Binomial name
- Subonoba ovata (Thiele, 1912)

Synonyms
- Onoba ovata (Thiele, 1912)

Species of gastropod

Subonoba ovata is a species of small sea snail, a marine gastropod mollusk or micromollusk in the family Rissoidae.
