= Subonoba turqueti =

Scientific classification
- Kingdom: Animalia
- Phylum: Mollusca
- Class: Gastropoda
- Subclass: Caenogastropoda
- Order: Littorinimorpha
- Family: Rissoidae
- Genus: Subonoba
- Species: S. turqueti

Binomial name
- Subonoba turqueti (Lamy, 1905)

Synonyms
- Onoba turqueti (Hedley, 1916); Onoba bickertoni (Hedley, 1916); Rissoia fraudulenta E. A. Smith, 1907; Rissoia turqueti Lamy, 1905 (original combination); Subonoba bickertoni Hedley, 1916

Species of gastropod

Subonoba turqueti is a species of small sea snail, a marine gastropod mollusk or micromollusk in the family Rissoidae. The maximum recorded shell length is 3.05 mm. Minimum recorded depth is 5 m. Maximum recorded depth is 167 m.
