= Subonoba gelida =

Scientific classification
- Kingdom: Animalia
- Phylum: Mollusca
- Class: Gastropoda
- Subclass: Caenogastropoda
- Order: Littorinimorpha
- Family: Rissoidae
- Genus: Subonoba
- Species: S. gelida

Binomial name
- Subonoba gelida (Smith, 1907)

Synonyms
- Rissoia gelida E.A. Smith, 1907 (original combination); Onoba gelida (E.A. Smith, 1907); Subonoba contigua Powell, 1957

Species of gastropod

Subonoba gelida is a species of small sea snail, a marine gastropod mollusk or micromollusk in the family Rissoidae.

The maximum recorded shell length is 2.94 mm. Minimum recorded depth is 94 m. Maximum recorded depth is 494 m.
