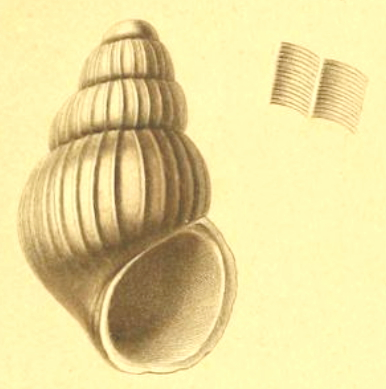
- Shell of Alvania verrilli (holotype)

Scientific classification
- Kingdom: Animalia
- Phylum: Mollusca
- Class: Gastropoda
- Subclass: Caenogastropoda
- Order: Littorinimorpha
- Superfamily: Rissooidea
- Family: Rissoidae
- Genus: Alvania
- Species: A. verrilli

Binomial name
- Alvania verrilli (Friele, 1886)

Synonyms
- Alvania karlini A. H. Clarke, 1963; Onoba verrilli (Friele, 1886) (currently placed in genus Alvania); Rissoa verrilli Friele, 1886

= Alvania verrilli =

Species of gastropod

Alvania verrilli is a species of small sea snail, a marine gastropod mollusk or micromollusk in the family Rissoidae.

== Distribution ==
This marine species occurs in the lower Estuary of St. Lawrence

== Description ==
The maximum recorded shell length is 2.9 mm.

(Original description) The white, solid shell is ovo-elongate. It contains 5 convex whorls. The protoconch is obtuse and smooth. The suture is deep. The aperture is sub-circular. The sculpture consists of, about 20 strongly prominent axial ribs, and a microscopically minute and close spiral striation. There is no umbilicus but only a minute umbilical split. The outer lip is thickened.

The peculiar fine spiral sculpture causes this species to be readily distinguishable.

== Habitat ==
Minimum recorded depth is 180 m. Maximum recorded depth is 190 m.
