= Onoba carpenteri =

Scientific classification
- Kingdom: Animalia
- Phylum: Mollusca
- Class: Gastropoda
- Subclass: Caenogastropoda
- Order: Littorinimorpha
- Family: Rissoidae
- Genus: Onoba
- Species: O. carpenteri

Binomial name
- Onoba carpenteri (Weinkauff, 1885)

Synonyms
- Alvania carpenteri (Weinkauff, 1885); Alvania keenae Gordon, 1939; Alvania kyskaensis Bartsch, 1917; Alvania montereyensis Bartsch, 1911; Alvania sanjuanensis Bartsch, 1920; Cingula eyerdami Willett, 1934

Species of gastropod

Onoba carpenteri is a species of small sea snail, a marine gastropod mollusk or micromollusk in the family Rissoidae.
