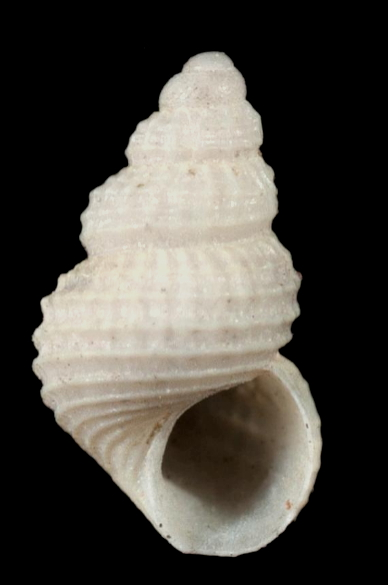
- Shell of Alvania jeffreysi (specimen at the Smithsonian Institution)

Scientific classification
- Kingdom: Animalia
- Phylum: Mollusca
- Class: Gastropoda
- Subclass: Caenogastropoda
- Order: Littorinimorpha
- Superfamily: Rissooidea
- Family: Rissoidae
- Genus: Alvania
- Species: A. jeffreysi

Binomial name
- Alvania jeffreysi (Waller, 1864)

Synonyms
- Rissoa jeffreysi E. Waller, 1864 (original combination); Onoba jeffrejsii [sic] (misspelling); Onoba jeffreysi (Waller, 1864)

= Alvania jeffreysi =

Species of gastropod

Alvania jeffreysi is a species of small sea snail in the family Rissoidae.

== Distribution ==
This marine species occurs in the eastern Atlantic Ocean with records from off the Shetland Islands, Skagerrak, and off Spain and Morocco.

== Description ==
Alvania jeffreysi grows to up to 3 mm high and 2 mm width.

The species was described from a specimen found in sand dredged north of Unst, Shetland Islands, Scotland from a depth of 85 fathoms (155 m). It was named in honour of conchologist and malacologist John Gwyn Jeffreys.

According to the original description, the white shell is conical, moderately strong, somewhat glossy and semi-transparent. It contains 5–6 whorls, sloping from the suture to the second ridge, and well rounded thence to the lower suture. The body whorl exceeds half the length of the shell, and is obliquely rounded at the base.

Sculpture: on the penultimate whorl there are four slender but well-defined spiral ridges, the lower three of which arc stronger than the highest one, which is on the upper slope of the whorl. The ridges are crossed by about twenty-eight perpendicular ribs, not so much elevated nor nearly as strong as the ridges.They form with them square cancellations, the intersections of the ridges and ribs being scarcely raised, but slightly nodulous. The apical whorls are marked with spiral rows of close angular punctures. In each succeeding row the punctures lie below the ridges separating those of the preceding row. The base of the lowest whorl has 5–7 spiral ridges, for the most part uncrossed by the ribs, which generally terminate at the line of the upper part of the aperture.

The suture deeply defined and somewhat excavated. The aperture is roundish oval. The outer lip is smooth inside, and strengthened outside by a broad and strong rib. The inner lip is smooth and reflected on the columella, making the peristome continuous. The umbilical chink is very small.

== Habitat ==
Alvania jeffreysi has been recorded from sandy bottoms at depths from 146 m to 264 m.
