= Onoba subantarctica =

Scientific classification
- Kingdom: Animalia
- Phylum: Mollusca
- Class: Gastropoda
- Subclass: Caenogastropoda
- Order: Littorinimorpha
- Family: Rissoidae
- Genus: Onoba
- Species: O. subantarctica

Binomial name
- Onoba subantarctica (Hedley, 1916)

Species of gastropod

Onoba subantarctica is a species of small sea snail, a marine gastropod mollusk or micromollusk in the family Rissoidae.
