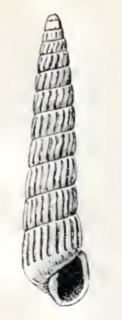
- Drawing of a shell of Turbonilla aculeus

Scientific classification
- Kingdom: Animalia
- Phylum: Mollusca
- Class: Gastropoda
- Family: Pyramidellidae
- Genus: Turbonilla
- Species: T. aculeus

Binomial name
- Turbonilla aculeus (C.B. Adams, 1852)

Synonyms
- Chemnitzia aculeus C. B. Adams, 1852 (basionym); Turbonilla (Chemnitzia)aculeus C.B. Adams, 1852

= Turbonilla aculeus =

Species of gastropod

Turbonilla aculeus is a species of sea snail, a marine gastropod mollusk in the family Pyramidellidae, the pyrams and their allies.

== Description ==
The very slender, diaphanous to milk-white shell has an elongate-conic shape. Its length measures 4.4 mm. The 2½ whorls of the protoconch are small. They form a small elevated helicoid spire, the axis of which is at right angles to that of the succeeding turns, in the first of which it is about one-third immersed. The twelve whorls of the teleoconch are slightly rounded, and weakly shouldered at the summit. They are marked by low, rounded, somewhat sinuous, protractive axial ribs, of which 14 occur upon the first to third, 16 upon the fourth and fifth, 18 upon the sixth to eighth, 20 upon the ninth, 22 upon the tenth, and 25 upon the penultimate turn. The intercostal spaces are about as wide as the ribs, well impressed, terminating at the sutures. The sutures are well marked. The periphery and the base of the body whorl are well rounded and smooth, excepting faint lines of growth. The small aperture is rhomboidal. The outer lip is thin, showing the external markings within. The columella is oblique, almost straight, and strongly reinforced by the base.

== Distribution ==
This species occurs in the Pacific Ocean off Panama.
