= Alvania wareni =

Scientific classification
- Kingdom: Animalia
- Phylum: Mollusca
- Class: Gastropoda
- Subclass: Caenogastropoda
- Order: Littorinimorpha
- Superfamily: Rissooidea
- Family: Rissoidae
- Genus: Alvania
- Species: A. wareni

Binomial name
- Alvania wareni (Templado & Rolan, 1986)

Synonyms
- Onoba wareni Templado & Rolán, 1986 (original combination)

Species of gastropod

Alvania wareni is a species of small sea snail, a marine gastropod mollusk or micromollusk in the family Rissoidae.

== Distribution ==
This marine species occurs off Portugal.
