= Boreocingula martyni =

Scientific classification
- Kingdom: Animalia
- Phylum: Mollusca
- Class: Gastropoda
- Subclass: Caenogastropoda
- Order: Littorinimorpha
- Family: Rissoidae
- Genus: Boreocingula
- Species: B. martyni

Binomial name
- Boreocingula martyni (Dall, 1886)

Species of gastropod

Boreocingula martyni is a species of small sea snail, a marine gastropod mollusc or micromollusc in the family Rissoidae.
