= Onoba grisea =

Scientific classification
- Kingdom: Animalia
- Phylum: Mollusca
- Class: Gastropoda
- Subclass: Caenogastropoda
- Order: Littorinimorpha
- Family: Rissoidae
- Genus: Onoba
- Species: O. grisea

Binomial name
- Onoba grisea (Martens, 1885)

Synonyms
- Onoba sulcata (Strebel, 1908); Rissoia sulcata Strebel, 1908

Species of gastropod

Onoba grisea is a species of small sea snail, a marine gastropod mollusk or micromollusk in the family Rissoidae.

== Description ==
The maximum recorded shell length is 2.52 mm.

== Habitat ==
Minimum recorded depth is 0 m. Maximum recorded depth is 102 m.
