= Boreocingula globulus =

Scientific classification
- Kingdom: Animalia
- Phylum: Mollusca
- Class: Gastropoda
- Subclass: Caenogastropoda
- Order: Littorinimorpha
- Family: Rissoidae
- Genus: Boreocingula
- Species: B. globulus

Binomial name
- Boreocingula globulus (Møller, 1842)

Synonyms
- Cingula globulus Onoba globulus

Species of gastropod

Boreocingula globulus is a species of small sea snail, a marine gastropod mollusk or micromollusk in the family Rissoidae.

== Description ==
The maximum recorded shell length is 3.5 mm.

== Habitat ==
Minimum recorded depth is 10 m. Maximum recorded depth is 450 m.
