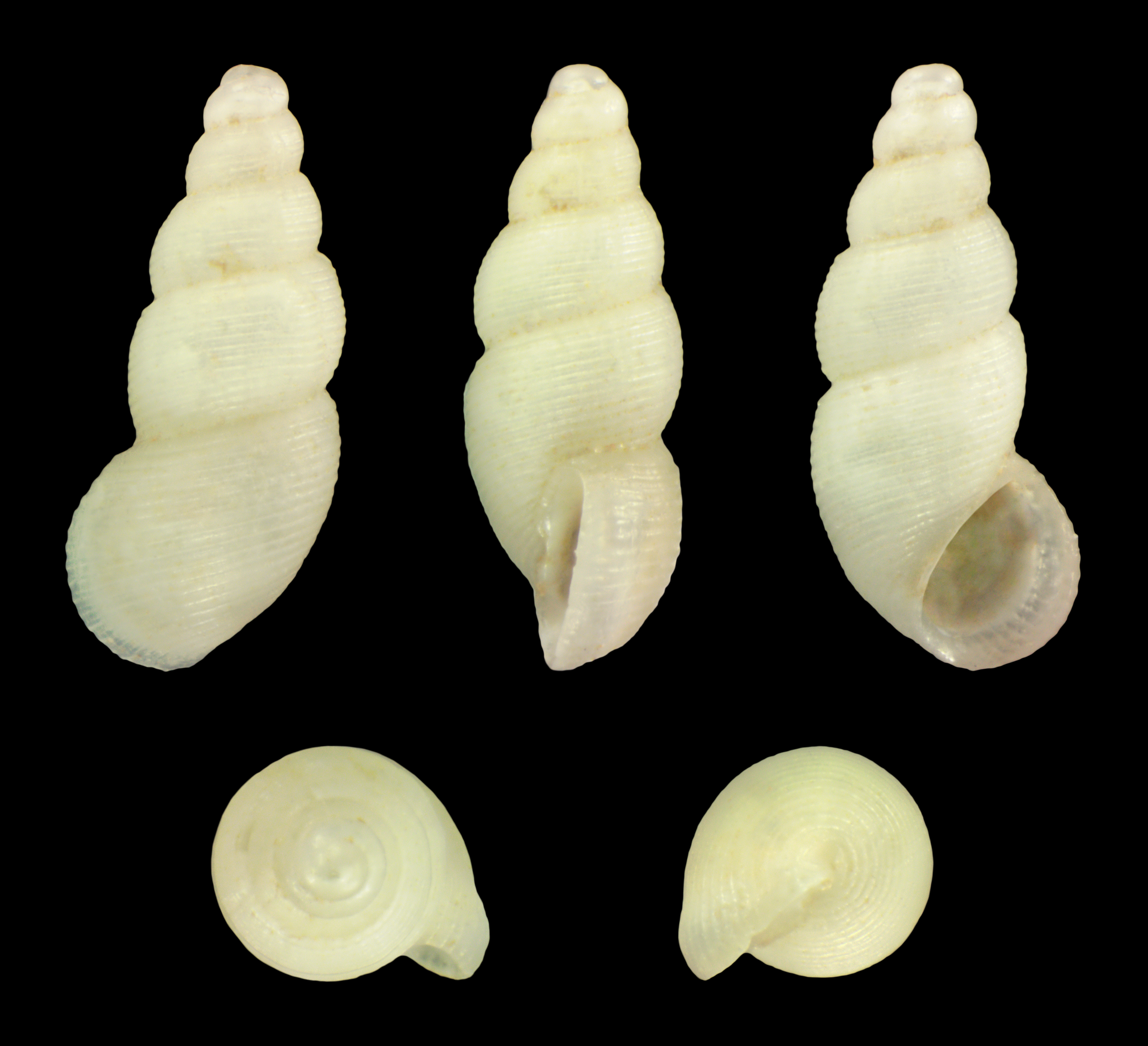
- Onoba aculeus shell

Scientific classification
- Kingdom: Animalia
- Phylum: Mollusca
- Class: Gastropoda
- Subclass: Caenogastropoda
- Order: Littorinimorpha
- Family: Rissoidae
- Genus: Onoba
- Species: O. aculeus

Binomial name
- Onoba aculeus (Gould, 1841)

Synonyms
- Alvania multilineata (Stimpson, 1851); Cingula aculeus Gould, 1841; Onoba aculea (Gould, 1841); Onoba karica Golikov, 1986; Rissoa arctica Lovén, 1846; Rissoa multilineata Stimpson, 1851; Rissoa saxatilis Møller, 1842

= Onoba aculeus =

Species of gastropod

Onoba aculeus, common name the pointed cingula, is a species of small sea snail, a marine gastropod mollusk or micromollusk in the family Rissoidae.

== Description ==
The maximum recorded shell length is 4.2 mm.

== Habitat ==
Minimum recorded depth is 0 m. Maximum recorded depth is 115 m.

== Distribution ==
This species occurs in European waters and in the North and Northeast Atlantic Ocean.

Distribution: Greenland; Greenland: West Greenland, East Greenland; Canada; Canada: Newfoundland, Gulf of St. Lawrence, Quebec, Nova Scotia, New Brunswick; USA: Maine, Massachusetts, Rhode Island, Connecticut; Eastern Atlantic: Iceland
