= Frigidoalvania pelagica =

Scientific classification
- Kingdom: Animalia
- Phylum: Mollusca
- Class: Gastropoda
- Subclass: Caenogastropoda
- Order: Littorinimorpha
- Family: Rissoidae
- Genus: Frigidoalvania
- Species: F. pelagica

Binomial name
- Frigidoalvania pelagica (Stimpson, 1851)

Synonyms
- Onoba pelagica (Stimpson, 1851)

Species of gastropod

Frigidoalvania pelagica, common name the carinate alvania, is a species of small sea snail, a marine gastropod mollusc or micromollusc in the family Rissoidae.

== Description ==
The maximum recorded shell length is 3 mm.

== Habitat ==
Minimum recorded depth is 13 m. Maximum recorded depth is 808 m.
