= Boreocingula castanea =

Scientific classification
- Kingdom: Animalia
- Phylum: Mollusca
- Class: Gastropoda
- Subclass: Caenogastropoda
- Order: Littorinimorpha
- Family: Rissoidae
- Genus: Boreocingula
- Species: B. castanea

Binomial name
- Boreocingula castanea (Møller, 1842)

Species of gastropod

Boreocingula castanea is a species of small sea snail, a marine gastropod mollusk or micromollusk in the family Rissoidae.

== Description ==
The maximum recorded shell length is 4.8 mm.

== Habitat ==
Minimum recorded depth is 2 m. Maximum recorded depth is 150 m.
