= Alvania moerchi =

Scientific classification
- Kingdom: Animalia
- Phylum: Mollusca
- Class: Gastropoda
- Subclass: Caenogastropoda
- Order: Littorinimorpha
- Superfamily: Rissooidea
- Family: Rissoidae
- Genus: Alvania
- Species: A. moerchi

Binomial name
- Alvania moerchi (Collin, 1886)

Synonyms
- Cingula moerchii Collin, 1886; Onoba moerchii (Collin, 1886)

Species of gastropod

Alvania moerchi is a species of small sea snail, a marine gastropod mollusk or micromollusk in the family Rissoidae.

== Description ==
The length of the shell attains 3 mm.

== Distribution ==
This species occurs in Arctic waters (Saguenay Fjord; downstream part of middle St. Lawrence estuary ); also off the Faroes.
