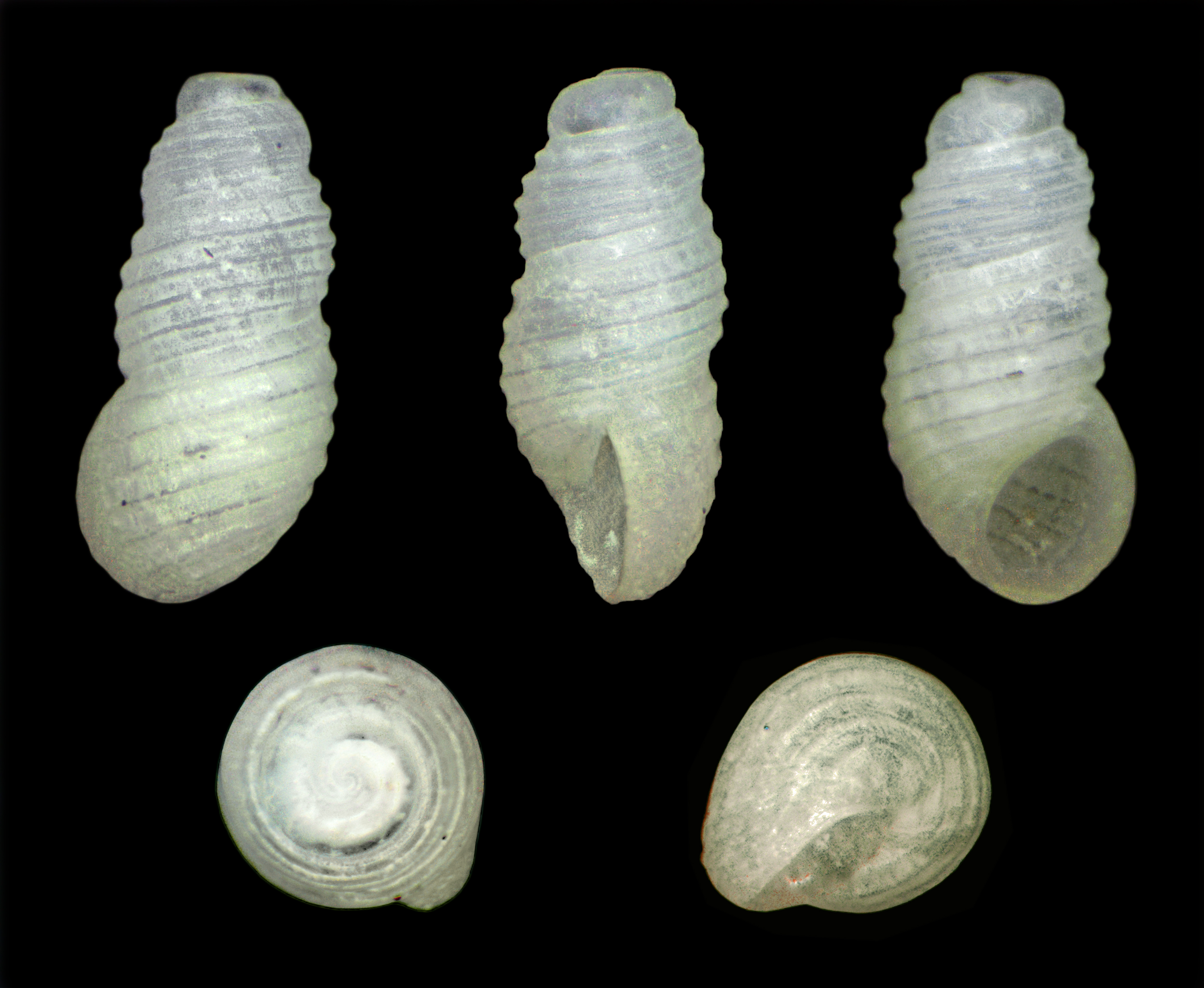
- Liroceratia sulcata shell

Scientific classification
- Kingdom: Animalia
- Phylum: Mollusca
- Class: Gastropoda
- Subclass: Caenogastropoda
- Order: Littorinimorpha
- Superfamily: Truncatelloidea
- Family: Iravadiidae; Thiele, 1928

Genera
- See text

Synonyms
- Fairbankiinae Thiele, 1928; Hyalidae Golikov & Starobogatov, 1975; Pseudomerelininae Starobogatov, 1989

= Iravadiidae =

Family of gastropods

Iravadiidae is a family of small sea snails, marine gastropod molluscs in the superfamily Truncatelloidea and the clade Littorinimorpha.

== Genera ==
Genera within the family Iravadiidae include:

- Acliceratia Ponder, 1984
- Auricorona Golding, 2014
- † Cavilabium Cossmann, 1888
- Ceratia H. & A. Adams, 1852
- Chevallieria Cossmann, 1888
- Fluviocingula Kuroda & Habe, 1954
- Hyala H. & A. Adams, 1852
- Iravadia H. Blanford, 1867
- † Kalchreuthia Gründel & Nützel, 1998
- Lantauia Ponder, 1994
- Liroceratia Ponder, 1984
- Nozeba Iredale, 1915
- † Pasitheola Cossmann, 1896
- Pellamora Iredale, 1943
- Pseudomerelina Ponder, 1984
- Pseudonoba O. Boettger, 1902
- Rehderiella Brandt, 1974
- Rissopsis Garrett, 1873
- Wakauria Kuroda & Habe, 1954

Genera brought into synonymy

- † Antinodulus Cossmann, 1919: synonym of Nozeba Iredale, 1915
- Dipsotoma Laseron, 1956: synonym of Iravadia (Pseudonoba) Boettger, 1902 represented as Iravadia Blanford, 1867
- Fairbankia Blanford, 1868: synonym of Iravadia (Fairbankia) Stoliczka, 1868 represented as Iravadia Blanford, 1867
- Fluviocingula Kuroda & Habe, 1954: synonym of Iravadia (Fluviocingula) Kuroda & Habe, 1954 represented as Iravadia Blanford, 1867
- Iraqirissoa Dance & Eames, 1966: synonym of Iravadia (Pseudonoba) Boettger, 1902 represented as Iravadia Blanford, 1867
- Lucidinella Laseron, 1956: synonym of Iravadia (Pseudonoba) Boettger, 1902 represented as Iravadia Blanford, 1867
- Mesodestea Laseron, 1956: synonym of Iravadia (Fluviocingula) Kuroda & Habe, 1954 represented as Iravadia Blanford, 1867
- Nanadoma Laseron, 1956: synonym of Chevallieria Cossmann, 1888
- Paronoba Laseron, 1950: synonym of Iravadia (Pseudonoba) Boettger, 1902 represented as Iravadia Blanford, 1867
- † Pasithea I. Lea, 1833: synonym of † Pasitheola Cossmann, 1896 †
- Pellamora Iredale, 1943: synonym of Iravadia (Fairbankia) Stoliczka, 1868 represented as Iravadia Blanford, 1867
- Pseudonoba O. Boettger, 1902: synonym of Iravadia (Pseudonoba) Boettger, 1902 represented as Iravadia Blanford, 1867
- Sinusicola Kuroda & Habe, 1950: synonym of Iravadia (Pseudonoba) Boettger, 1902 represented as Iravadia Blanford, 1867
- Syntharella Laseron, 1955: synonym of Nozeba Iredale, 1915
