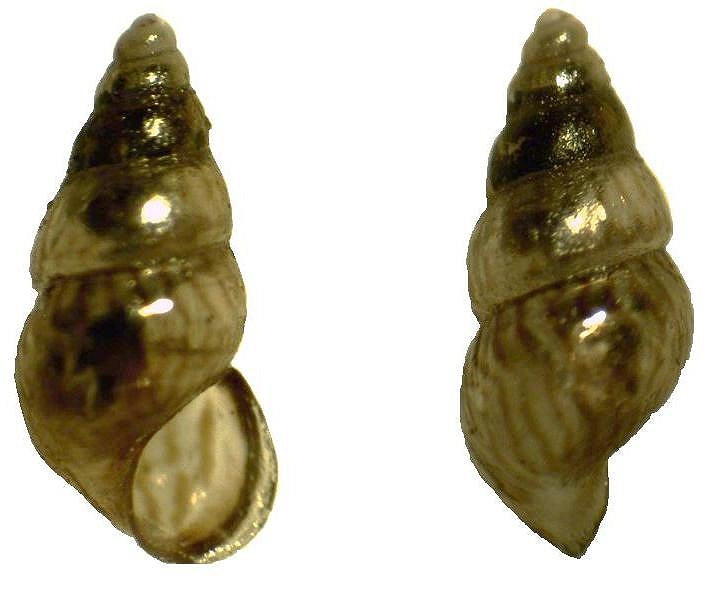
- Shell of Rissoa janusi

Scientific classification
- Kingdom: Animalia
- Phylum: Mollusca
- Class: Gastropoda
- Subclass: Caenogastropoda
- Order: Littorinimorpha
- Family: Rissoidae
- Genus: Rissoa; Freminville in Desmarest, 1814

Type species
- Rissoa ventricosa Desmarest, 1814

Species
- See text

Synonyms
- Apicularia Monterosato, 1884; Elatiella Nordsieck, 1972; Goniostoma Villa, 1841; Gueriniana Nordsieck, 1972; Lamarckia Leach, 1852; Liavenustia Nordsieck, 1972; Lilacinia Nordsieck, 1972; Loxostoma Bivona-Bernardi, 1838; Persephona Leach, 1852; Rissoia Bronn, 1848; Rissostomia G.O. Sars, 1878; Sabanea Monterosato, 1884; Schwartzia Bucquoy, Dautzenberg & Dollfus, 1884; Sfaxiella Nordsieck, 1972; Turboella Leach, 1847; Zippora Leach, 1852

= Rissoa =

Genus of gastropods

Rissoa is a genus of minute sea snails, marine gastropod mollusks or micromollusks in the family Rissoidae.

The genus was first introduced by M. de Freminville for some small shells observed by M. Antoine Risso, a distinguished naturalist of Nice, France. They were described by M. Demarest in 1814 in the "New Bulletin of the Philomatic Society".

== Description ==
The soft body of the snail is elongated and spiral. The somewhat prolonged mouth has a proboscis. The tentacles are awl-shaped with the eyes on a small prominence near the base. The foot is oval or elliptical. The species is phytophagous.

The conical shell has an elongated spire with its apex nipple-shaped. The size of the shell varies between 1 mm and 8 mm. The whorls are generally convex-shaped with a distinct suture. The aperture is ovate, roundish or pear-shaped with its anterior end rounded, the posterior end acute and with the peristome complete. The thin and horny operculum is spirally marked and equally ovate, roundish or pear-shaped.

== Habitat ==
This species can be found on brown algae (genus Fucus), in clefts of rocks, on stones, on mud or sand. Most will be found on sandy beaches along the line of the last tide.

== Species ==
Species within the genus Rissoa include:

- Rissoa aartseni Verduin, 1985
- Rissoa acerosa Seguenza, 1903
- Rissoa acutata Schauroth, 1857 †
- Rissoa acuticosta (Sacco, 1895) † (Homonymy junior secondary homonym of R. acuticosta Von Koenen, 1892, which seems to be a true Rissoa)
- Rissoa acuticosta Von Koenen, 1892 †
- Rissoa adela d'Orbigny, 1852 †
- Rissoa aethiopica Thiele, 1925
- Rissoa albugo Watson, 1873
- † Rissoa alienocurta Lozouet, 1998
- Rissoa alleryi (Nordsieck, 1972)
- Rissoa alpina Gümbel, 1861 †
- Rissoa angusticostata Sandberger, 1860 †
- Rissoa angustior (Monterosato, 1917) (taxon inquirendum)
- Rissoa anomala Eichwald, 1830 †
- Rissoa arata Philippi, 1849
- Rissoa athymorhyssa Dall, 1892 †
- Rissoa auriculata Seguenza, 1903
- Rissoa auriformis Pallary, 1904
- Rissoa auriscalpium (Linnaeus, 1758)
- Rissoa australis G. B. Sowerby II, 1877
- Rissoa baldacconii Cantraine, 1842 †
- Rissoa balliae W. Thompson, 1840
- Rissoa banatica Jekelius, 1944 †
- Rissoa basisulcata Etheridge & Bell in Bell, 1898 †
- Rissoa becki W. H. Turton, 1933
- Rissoa bissulca Buvignier, 1843 †
- Rissoa boytonensis Harmer, 1925 †
- Rissoa buccinalis (Lamarck, 1804) †
- Rissoa callistrophia Dall, 1892 †
- Rissoa candidata W. H. Turton, 1932
- Rissoa certa Svagrovský, 1971 †
- Rissoa clotho Hörnes, 1856 †
- Rissoa conica L. Périer, 1867
- Rissoa conuloidea Etheridge & Bell in Bell, 1893 †
- Rissoa cooperi Tryon, 1865
- Rissoa costeiensis Kowalke & Harzhauser, 2004 †
- Rissoa costellata Grateloup, 1838 †
- Rissoa crefeldensis Wiechmann, 1874 †
- Rissoa crux Eichwald, 1853 †
- Rissoa cureti Cossmann, 1918 †
- Rissoa curta Dall, 1927: (taxon inquirendum, non Dujardin, 1837)
- Rissoa curticostata S. V. Wood, 1848 †
- Rissoa cylindrella Odhner, 1924
- Rissoa decipiens Deshayes, 1861 †
- Rissoa decorata Philippi, 1846
- Rissoa decorticata Landau, Ceulemans & Van Dingenen, 2018 †
- Rissoa degrangei (Cossmann & Peyrot, 1919) †
- Rissoa densecosta Etheridge & Bell in Bell, 1893 †
- Rissoa dilemma O. Boettger, 1907 †
- Rissoa dissimilis Harmer, 1920 †
- Rissoa dobrogica Necrasov, 1936
- Rissoa duboisii Nyst, 1845 †
- Rissoa dupiniana d'Orbigny, 1842 †
- Rissoa electrae Manousis, 2019
- Rissoa elegantula Piette, 1857 †
- Rissoa epulata Pilsbry & C. W. Johnson, 1917 †
- Rissoa eurydictium Cossmann, 1888 †
- Rissoa euxinica Milaschevich, 1909
- Rissoa exigua Eichwald, 1830 †
- Rissoa flexuosa Von Koenen, 1892 †
- Rissoa fragilis (Lamarck, 1804) †
- Rissoa fraterna Wiechmann, 1874 †
- Rissoa frauenfeldiana Brusina, 1868
- Rissoa gemmula Fischer P. in de Folin, 1869
- Rissoa geraea Dall, 1892 †
- Rissoa gibsoni T. Brown, 1841 †
- Rissoa glabrata G. B. Sowerby II, 1859
- Rissoa goepperti Schauroth, 1857 †
- Rissoa gomerica (Nordsieck & Talavera, 1979)
- Rissoa gracilicosta Etheridge & Bell in Bell, 1893 †
- Rissoa granulum Philippi, 1844 (taxon inquirendum)
- Rissoa guerinii Récluz, 1843
- Rissoa guernei Dautzenberg, 1889
- Rissoa harmeri Faber, 2018 †
- Rissoa hebes O. Boettger, 1907 †
- Rissoa hidasensis Csepreghy-Meznerics, 1950 †
- Rissoa houdasi Cossmann, 1907
- Rissoa ilca Thiele, 1925
- Rissoa inchoata Deshayes, 1861 †
- Rissoa incompta A. A. Gould, 1862
- Rissoa incrassata J. Müller, 1851 †
- Rissoa inflexicosta (Cossmann, 1921) †
- Rissoa infrastriolata Thiele, 1925
- Rissoa innocens W. H. Turton, 1932
- Rissoa intermedia Grateloup, 1838 †
- Rissoa intusstriata Etheridge & Bell in Bell, 1893 †
- Rissoa irritans Thiele, 1925
- Rissoa italiensis Verduin, 1985
- Rissoa janusi (Nordsieck, 1972)
- Rissoa jurensis Etallon, 1862 †
- Rissoa karsteni R. Janssen, 1978 †
- Rissoa latior (Mighels & C. B. Adams, 1844)
- Rissoa leighi T. Brown, 1841 †
- Rissoa lia (Monterosato, 1884)
- Rissoa lilacina Récluz, 1843
- Rissoa lipeus Dall, 1892 †
- Rissoa lusoria Yokoyama, 1926 †
- Rissoa macra R. B. Watson, 1886
- Rissoa maya Yokoyama, 1926 †
- Rissoa membranacea (Adams J., 1800)
- Rissoa microcharia Dall, 1892 †
- Rissoa mirabilis Manzoni, 1868
- Rissoa misera Deshayes, 1861 †
- Rissoa mitreola Eichwald, 1853 †
- Rissoa modesta (H. C. Lea, 1845)
- Rissoa monodonta Philippi, 1836
- Rissoa moreana Buvignier, 1852 †
- Rissoa mosensis Buvignier, 1852 †
- Rissoa mucronata Svagrovský, 1971 †
- Rissoa multicincta (Smriglio & Mariottini, 1995)
- Rissoa multicostata (Nordsieck & Talavera, 1979)
- Rissoa munieri Szöts, 1953 †
- Rissoa nina Nordsieck, 1972 (nomen dubium)
- Rissoa obeliscoides Landau, Ceulemans & Van Dingenen, 2018 †
- Rissoa obeliscus May, 1915
- Rissoa obtusa T. Brown, 1841 †
- Rissoa olangoensis Poppe, Tagaro & Stahlschmidt, 2015
- Rissoa oldhamiana Stoliczka, 1867 †
- Rissoa ovulum Philippi, 1844 †
- Rissoa pachia R. B. Watson, 1886
- Rissoa panhormensis Verduin, 1985
- Rissoa papuana Tapparone Canefri, 1877
- Rissoa paradoxa (Monterosato, 1884)
- Rissoa parva (da Costa, 1778)
- Rissoa patens A. A. Gould, 1862
- Rissoa paupera Thiele, 1925
- Rissoa peregra Thiele, 1925
- Rissoa perforata Thiele, 1925
- Rissoa perspecta E. A. Smith, 1904
- Rissoa phagon J. A. Gardner, 1947 †
- Rissoa plagiostoma Thiele, 1925
- Rissoa plica Can, 18444traine, 1842
- Rissoa pompholyx Dall, 1927
- Rissoa poustagnacensis Lozouet, 1998 †
- Rissoa pouweri Van Dingenen, Ceulemans & Landau, 2016 †
- Rissoa proditoris Thiele, 1925
- Rissoa pseudoguerini (Nordsieck & Talavera, 1979)
- Rissoa pseudoturricula Strausz, 1966 †
- Rissoa pucilla T. Brown, 1841 †
- Rissoa punctatissima R. Janssen, 1978 †
- Rissoa punctum Cantraine, 1842
- Rissoa quantilla W. H. Turton, 1932
- Rissoa quarantellii Brunetti & Vecchi, 2005 †
- Rissoa reussi Geinitz, 1875 †
- Rissoa rimata Philippi, 1844 †
- Rissoa robusta (H. C. Lea, 1845)
- Rissoa rodhensis Verduin, 1985
- Rissoa rufa Philippi, 1849
- Rissoa rufanensis W. H. Turton, 1933
- Rissoa rugosa Svagrovský, 1971 †
- Rissoa rustica R. B. Watson, 1886
- Rissoa sadoensis Yokoyama, 1926 †
- Rissoa sandbergeri J. Müller, 1851 †
- Rissoa sarae Brunetti, Cresti & Forli, 2017 †
- Rissoa scurra (Monterosato, 1917)
- Rissoa scutula Bell, 1892 †
- Rissoa searlesii Harmer, 1925 †
- Rissoa seguenzorum Bertolaso & Palazzi, 2000 †
- Rissoa selseyensis Harmer, 1925 †
- Rissoa semicarinata de Folin, 1870
- Rissoa semilaevis Von Koenen, 1892 †
- Rissoa senecta S. V. Wood, 1872 †
- Rissoa siberutensis Thiele, 1925
- Rissoa similis Scacchi, 1836
- Rissoa sismondiana Issel, 1869
- Rissoa sobieskii Friedberg, 1923 †
- Rissoa soceni Jekelius, 1944 †
- Rissoa solidula Philippi, 1849
- Rissoa sordida W. H. Turton, 1932
- Rissoa sowerbyi W. H. Turton, 1932
- Rissoa spinosa Seguenza †
- Rissoa splendida Eichwald, 1830
- Rissoa striatula Eichwald, 1830 †
- Rissoa strombecki Schauroth, 1857 †
- Rissoa subcarinta Cantraine, 1842 †
- Rissoa subclathrata Buvignier, 1852 †
- Rissoa sublachesis Zhizhchenko, 1936 †
- Rissoa submarginata d'Orbigny, 1850 †
- Rissoa subperforata Jeffreys, 1884 †
- Rissoa sulcifera G. B. Sowerby II, 1876
- Rissoa sumatrana Thiele, 1925
- Rissoa sundaica Thiele, 1925
- Rissoa suttonensis Harmer, 1925 †
- Rissoa tenuilineata (Cossmann, 1921) †
- Rissoa terebellum Philippi, 1844 †
- Rissoa terebralis Grateloup, 1838 †
- Rissoa teres W. H. Turton, 1932
- Rissoa texta Borchert, 1901
- Rissoa tirolensis Koken in Wöhrmann & Koken, 1892 †
- Rissoa tomlini W. H. Turton, 1933
- Rissoa torquata Landau, Ceulemans & Van Dingenen, 2018 †
- Rissoa torquilla Pallary, 1912
- Rissoa trabeata Weisbord, 1962 †
- Rissoa triasina Schauroth, 1857 †
- Rissoa tristriata W. Thompson, 1840
- Rissoa tritonia W. H. Turton, 1932
- Rissoa tropica Stoliczka, 1868 †
- Rissoa turbinata (Lamarck, 1804) †
- Rissoa turbinopsis Deshayes, 1861 †
- Rissoa turricula Eichwald, 1830 †
- Rissoa umbilicata Philippi, 1851
- Rissoa undulata Deshayes, 1861 †
- Rissoa unisulca Buvignier, 1843 †
- Rissoa valfini Guirand & Ogérien, 1865 †
- Rissoa variabilis (Von Mühlfeldt, 1824)
- Rissoa velata Zekeli, 1852 †
- Rissoa ventricosa Desmarest, 1814
- Rissoa venus d'Orbigny, 1852 †
- Rissoa venusta Philippi, 1844
- Rissoa verdensis Rolán & Oliveira, 2008
- Rissoa vicina Milaschevich, 1909
- Rissoa violacea Desmarest, 1814
- Rissoa virdunensis Buvignier, 1852 †
- Rissoa winkleri Müller, 1851 †
- Rissoa ziga De Gregorio, 1890 †
- Rissoa zosta Bayan, 1873 †

== Synonyms ==
- Rissoa adarensis E.A. Smith, 1902: synonym of Onoba kergueleni (E. A. Smith, 1875)
- Rissoa albella Lovén, 1846: synonym of Pusillina sarsii (Lovén, 1846)
- Rissoa albella Alder, 1844: synonym of Rissoella diaphana (Alder, 1848)
- Rissoa albida C. B. Adams, 1845: synonym of Zebinella albida (C. B. Adams, 1845)
- Rissoa albolirata Carpenter, 1864: synonym of Lirobarleeia albolirata (Carpenter, 1864)
- Rissoa alifera Thiele, 1925: synonym of Hoplopteron alifera (Thiele, 1925)
- Rissoa alveata Melvill & Standen, 1901: synonym of Iravadia quadrasi (O. Boettger, 1893)
- Rissoa atomus E. A. Smith, 1890 : synonym of Eatonina fulgida (Adams J., 1797)
- Rissoa australis Watson, 1886: synonym of Powellisetia australis (Watson, 1886)
- Rissoa basispiralis Grant-Mackie & Chapman-Smith, 1971 † a: synonym of Diala semistriata (Philippi, 1849)
- Rissoa boscii (Payraudeau, 1826): synonym of Melanella polita (Linnaeus, 1758)
- Rissoa calathus Forbes & Hanley, 1850: synonym of Alvania beanii (Hanley in Thorpe, 1844)
- Rissoa candidissima Webster, 1905 : synonym of Subonoba candidissima (Webster, 1905)
- Rissoa carnosa Webster, 1905: synonym of Fictonoba carnosa (Webster, 1905)
- Rissoa cazini Vélain, 1877: synonym of Pisinna cazini (Vélain, 1877)
- Rissoa cerithinum Philippi, 1849: synonym of Cerithidium cerithinum (Philippi, 1849)
- Rissoa columna Pelseneer, 1903: synonym of Onoba kergueleni (E. A. Smith, 1875)
- Rissoa corilea G. B. Sowerby II, 1876: synonym of Stosicia corilea (G. B. Sowerby II, 1876)
- Rissoa coronata Scacchi, 1844: synonym of Opalia hellenica (Forbes, 1844)
- Rissoa costata (J. Adams, 1796): synonym of Manzonia crassa (Kanmacher, 1798)
- Rissoa costulata Alder, 1844: synonym of Rissoa guerinii Récluz, 1843
- Rissoa crassicostata C. B. Adams, 1845: synonym of Opalia hotessieriana (d’Orbigny, 1842)
- Rissoa deserta E.A. Smith, 1907: synonym of Powellisetia deserta (E.A. Smith, 1907)
- Rissoa diaphana Alder, 1848: synonym of Rissoella diaphana (Alder, 1848)
- Rissoa dolium Nyst, 1845: synonym of Pusillina philippi (Aradas & Maggiore, 1844)
- Rissoa dubiosa C. B. Adams, 1850: synonym of Schwartziella dubiosa (C. B. Adams, 1850)
- Rissoa edgariana Melvill & Standen, 1907: synonym of Rissoa parva (da Costa, 1778)
- Rissoa edwardiensis Watson, 1886: synonym of Skenella edwardiensis (Watson, 1886)
- Rissoa emarginata Hutton, 1885: synonym of Nozeba emarginata (Hutton, 1885)
- Rissoa emblematica Hedley, 1906: synonym of Emblanda emblematica (Hedley, 1906)
- Rissoa eulimoides (C.B. Adams, 1850): synonym of Melanella eulimoides (C. B. Adams, 1850)
- Rissoa filostria Melvill & Standen, 1912: synonym of Onoba filostria (Melvill & Standen, 1912)
- Rissoa finckhi Hedley, 1899: synonym of Chrystella finckhi (Hedley, 1899)
- Rissoa garretti Tate, 1899: synonym of Iravadia quadrasi (O. Boettger, 1893)
- Rissoa georgiana Pfeffer, 1886: synonym of Onoba georgiana (Pfeffer, 1886)
- Rissoa gracilis Pease, 1860: synonym of Pyramidelloides angustus (Hedley, 1898)
- Rissoa griegi Friele, 1879: synonym of Cingula griegi (Friele, 1879)
- Rissoa grisea Martens, 1885: synonym of Onoba grisea (Martens, 1885)
- Rissoa inconspicua Alder, 1844: synonym of Pusillina inconspicua (Alder, 1844)
- Rissoa inconspicua C. B. Adams, 1852: synonym of Alvania monserratensis Baker, Hanna & Strong, 1930
- Rissoa inflatella Thiele, 1912: synonym of Onoba inflatella (Thiele, 1912)
- Rissoa infrequens C. B. Adams, 1852: synonym of Opalia infrequens (C. B. Adams, 1852)
- Rissoa integella Hedley, 1904: synonym of Attenuata integella (Hedley, 1904)
- Rissoa interrupta (J. Adams, 1800): synonym of Rissoa parva (da Costa, 1778)
- Rissoa janmayeni Friele, 1878: synonym of Frigidoalvania janmayeni (Friele, 1878)
- Rissoa kelseyi Dall & Bartsch, 1902: synonym of Lirobarleeia kelseyi (Dall & Bartsch, 1902)
- Rissoa kergueleni E. A. Smith, 1875: synonym of Onoba kergueleni (E. A. Smith, 1875)
- Rissoa labiosa (Montagu, 1803): synonym of Rissoa membranacea (J. Adams, 1800)
- Rissoa laevigata C. B. Adams, 1850: synonym of Zebina browniana (d'Orbigny, 1842)
- Rissoa lantzi Vélain, 1877: synonym of Onoba lantzi (Vélain, 1877)
- Rissoa lineolata Michaud, 1830: synonym of Pusillina lineolata (Michaud, 1832)
- Rissoa lirata Carpenter, 1857: synonym of Lirobarleeia lirata (Carpenter, 1857)
- Rissoa marionensis Watson, 1886: synonym of Eatoniella subrufescens (E.A. Smith, 1875)
- Rissoa miliaris Thiele, 1912: synonym of Skenella sinapi (Watson, 1886)
- Rissoa observationis Thiele, 1912: synonym of Onoba kergueleni (E. A. Smith, 1875)
- Rissoa ordinaria E. A. Smith, 1890: synonym of Eatoniella ordinaria (E. A. Smith, 1890)
- Rissoa paucilirata Melvill & Standen, 1912: synonym of Onoba paucilirata (Melvill & Standen, 1912)
- Rissoa pelseneeri Thiele, 1912: synonym of Powellisetia pelseneeri (Thiele, 1912)
- Rissoa porifera (Lovén, 1843): synonym of Rissoa lilacina Récluz, 1843
- Rissoa principis Watson, 1886: synonym of Powellisetia principis (Watson, 1886)
- Rissoa proxima Forbes & Hanley, 1850: synonym of Ceratia proxima (Forbes & Hanley, 1850)
- Rissoa punctatostriata Tenison Woods, 1879: synonym of Leucotina casta (A. Adams, 1853)
- Rissoa punctulum Philippi, 1836: synonym of Pisinna glabrata (Von Mühlfeldt, 1824)
- Rissoa rufilabris Alder, 1844: synonym of Rissoa lilacina Récluz, 1843
- Rissoa rufilabrum Alder, 1844: synonym of Rissoa lilacina Récluz, 1843
- Rissoa sarsii Lovén, 1846: synonym of Pusillina sarsii (Lovén, 1846)
- Rissoa scalarella C. B. Adams, 1845: synonym of Schwartziella scalarella (C. B. Adams, 1845)
- Rissoa scotiana Melvill & Standen, 1907: synonym of Onoba semicostata (Montagu, 1803)
- Rissoa semistriata Philippi, 1849: synonym of Diala semistriata (Philippi, 1849)
- Rissoa sinapi Watson, 1886: synonym of Skenella sinapi (Watson, 1886)
- Rissoa sinuosa Scacchi, 1836: synonym of Melanella sinuosa (Scacchi, 1836)
- Rissoa striata (J. Adams, 1797): synonym of Onoba semicostata (Montagu, 1803)
- Rissoa striatula Jeffreys, 1847: synonym of Ceratia proxima (Forbes & Hanley, 1850)
- Rissoa studeriana Thiele, 1912: synonym of Onoba steineni (Strebel, 1908)
- Rissoa suavis Thiele, 1925: synonym of Onoba suavis (Thiele, 1925)
- Rissoa subangulata C.B. Adams, 1850: synonym of Schwartziella bryerea (Montagu, 1803)
- Rissoa subantarctica Thiele, 1912: synonym of Onoba subantarctica (Thiele, 1912)
- Rissoa subcostulata Schwartz, 1864: synonym of Rissoa guerinii Récluz, 1843
- Rissoa subtruncata Pelseneer, 1903: synonym of Powellisetia pelseneeri (Thiele, 1912)
- Rissoa subtruncata Vélain, 1877: synonym of Scrobs subtruncata (Vélain, 1877)
- Rissoa syngenes (A. E. Verril, 1884): synonym of Alvania syngenes (A. E. Verrill, 1884)
- Rissoa transenna Watson, 1886: synonym of Onoba transenna (Watson, 1886)
- Rissoa valdiviae Thiele, 1925: synonym of Onoba steineni (Strebel, 1908)
- Rissoa venusta Garrett, 1873: synonym of Iravadia quadrasi (O. Boettger, 1893)
- Rissoa vitrea C. B. Adams, 1850: synonym of Zebina vitrea (C. B. Adams, 1850)
- Rissoa xanthias Watson, 1886: synonym of Benthonellania xanthias (Watson, 1886)
- Rissoa xanthias var. acuticostata Dall, 1889: synonym of Benthonellania acuticostata (Dall, 1889)
