= Benthonellania multicostata =

Scientific classification
- Kingdom: Animalia
- Phylum: Mollusca
- Class: Gastropoda
- Subclass: Caenogastropoda
- Order: Littorinimorpha
- Family: Rissoidae
- Genus: Benthonellania
- Species: B. multicostata

Binomial name
- Benthonellania multicostata Absalão & Santos, 2004

Species of gastropod

Benthonellania multicostata is a species of small sea snail, a marine gastropod mollusk or micromollusk in the family Rissoidae.

== Description ==
The maximum recorded shell length is 1.05 mm.

== Habitat ==
Minimum recorded depth is 184 m. Maximum recorded depth is 1031 m.
