= Hoplopteron terquemi =

Scientific classification
- Kingdom: Animalia
- Phylum: Mollusca
- Class: Gastropoda
- Subclass: Caenogastropoda
- Order: Littorinimorpha
- Family: Eulimidae
- Genus: Hoplopteron
- Species: H. terquemi

Binomial name
- Hoplopteron terquemi P. Fischer, 1876

Species of gastropod

Hoplopteron terquemi is a species of sea snail, a marine gastropod mollusk in the family Eulimidae. This species, along with Hoplopteron alifera, belongs in the genus, Hoplopteron.
