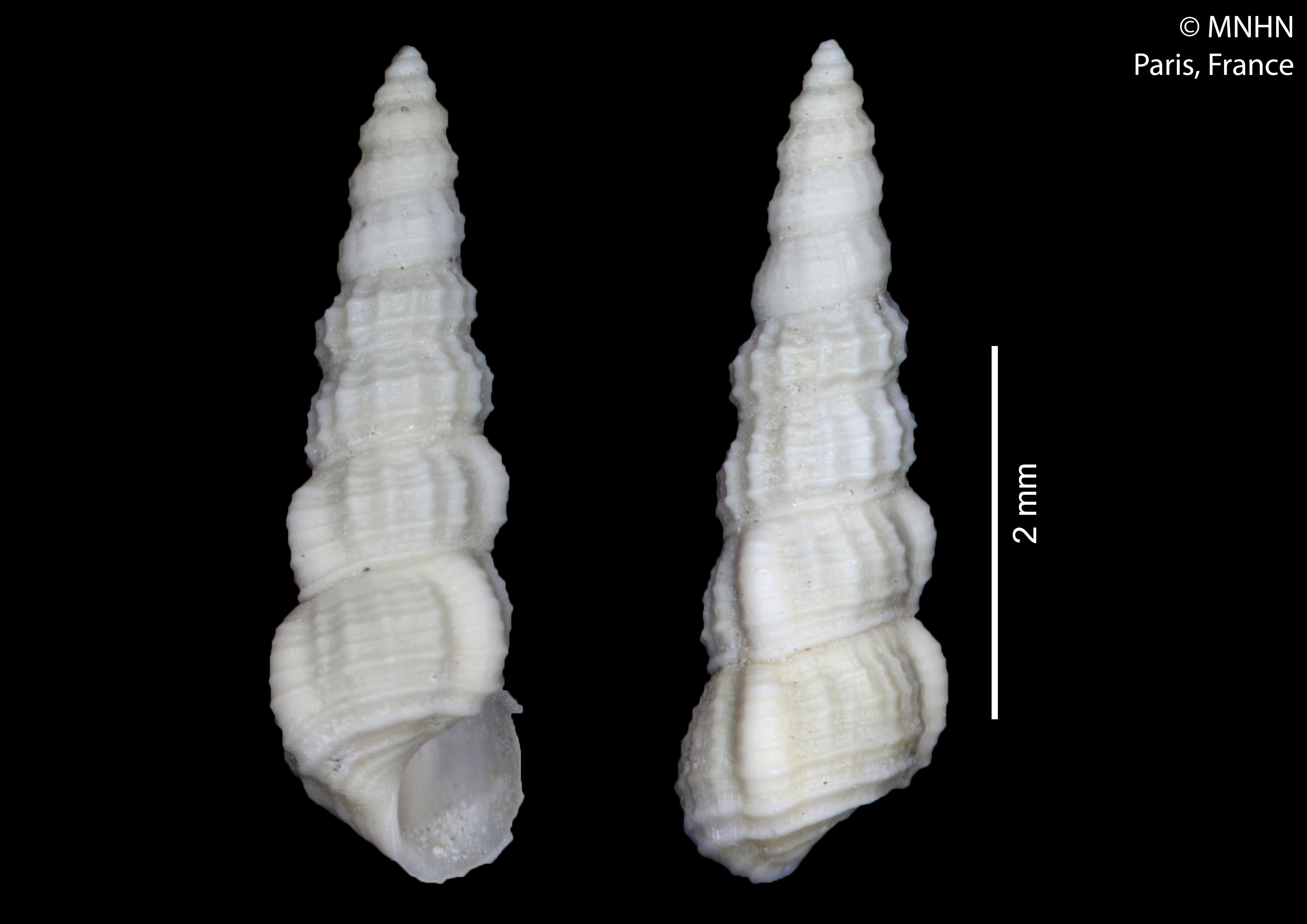
- Shell of † Cerithidium plebeium (holotype at MNHN, Paris)

Scientific classification
- Kingdom: Animalia
- Phylum: Mollusca
- Class: Gastropoda
- Subclass: Caenogastropoda
- Order: incertae sedis
- Superfamily: Cerithioidea
- Family: Cerithiidae
- Genus: Cerithidium; Monterosato, 1884

Type species
- Cerithium submammillatum de Rayneval & Ponzi, 1854

Synonyms
- Bittium (Cerithidium) Monterosato, 1884; Clathrofenella Kuroda & Habe, 1952

= Cerithidium =

Genus of gastropods

Cerithidium is a genus of sea snails, marine gastropod mollusks in the family Cerithiidae.

The genus has been used as valid for Indo-Pacific species following Hasegawa (1998), on the grounds that it is older than Clathrofenella Kuroda & Habe, 1952. However, the Mediterranean type species is a Bittium, for which reason this generic assignment should be revised. The opinion of Hasegawa (1998) and van Aartsen (2006) is followed here

== Species ==
Species within the genus Cerithidium include:

- Cerithidium actinium Rehder, 1980
- Cerithidium australiense Thiele, 1930
- Cerithidium cerithinum (Philippi, 1849)
- Cerithidium californica
- Cerithidium diplax (Watson, 1886)
- † Cerithidium fragrans Barnard, 1963
- Cerithidium fuscum (A. Adams, 1860)
- Cerithidium liratum Thiele, 1930
- † Cerithidium perminimum (de Boury, 1900)
- Cerithidium perparvulum (Watson, 1886)
- † Cerithidium plebeium Lozouet, 1998
- Cerithidium submamillatum (De Rayneval & Ponzi, 1854)

Species brought into synonymy

- Cerithidium pusillum (Jeffreys, 1856): synonym of Bittium submammillatum (de Rayneval & Ponzi, 1854) synonym of Cerithidium submammillatum (De Rayneval & Ponzi, 1854)
- Cerithidium reticulatum (A. Adams, 1860): synonym of Cerithidium fuscum (A. Adams, 1860)
