= Rissoa rodhensis =

Scientific classification
- Kingdom: Animalia
- Phylum: Mollusca
- Class: Gastropoda
- Subclass: Caenogastropoda
- Order: Littorinimorpha
- Family: Rissoidae
- Genus: Rissoa
- Species: R. rodhensis

Binomial name
- Rissoa rodhensis Verduin, 1985

Synonyms
- Rissoa lilacina rhodhensis

Species of gastropod

Rissoa rodhensis is a species of minute sea snail, a marine gastropod mollusc or micromollusc in the family Rissoidae.
