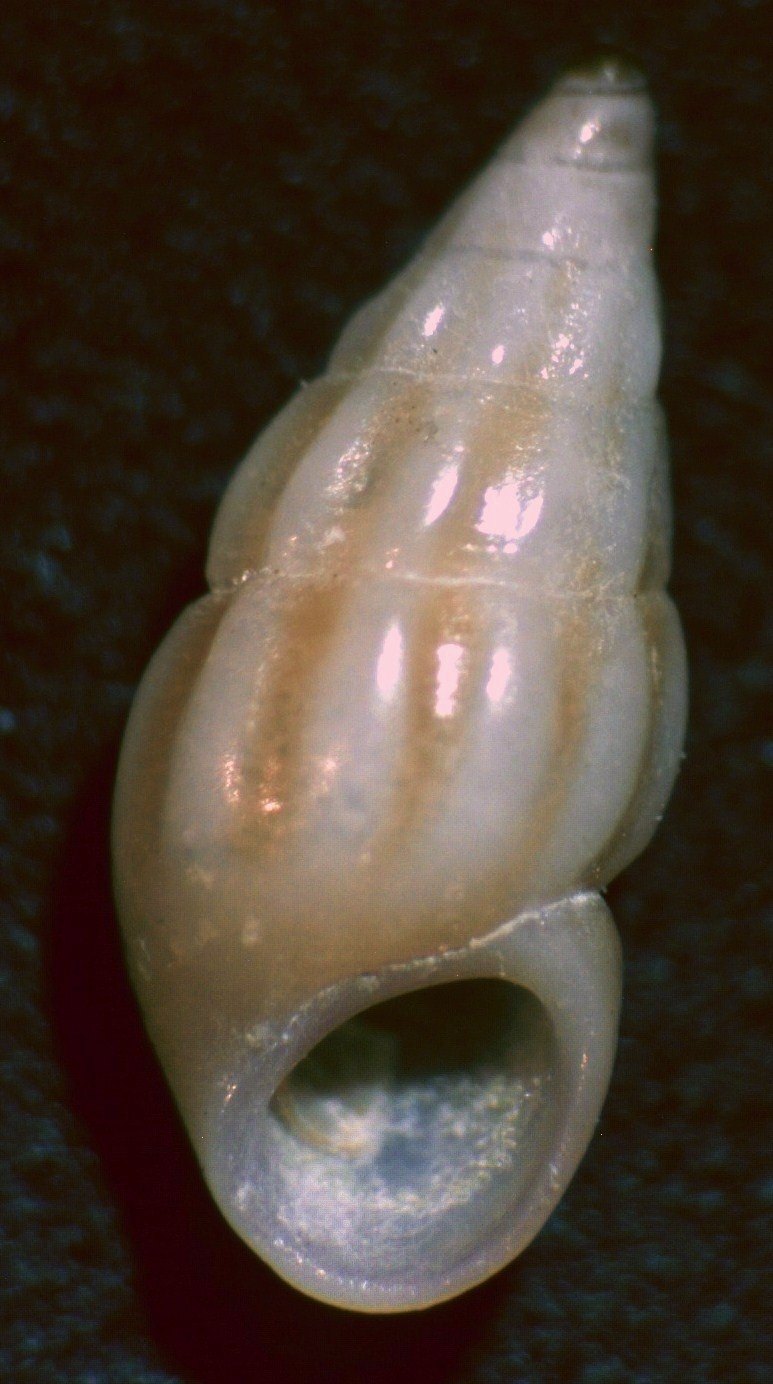

Scientific classification
- Kingdom: Animalia
- Phylum: Mollusca
- Class: Gastropoda
- Subclass: Caenogastropoda
- Order: Littorinimorpha
- Family: Rissoidae
- Genus: Rissoa
- Species: R. membranacea

Binomial name
- Rissoa membranacea (Adams J., 1800)

Synonyms
- Alvania plicatula Risso, 1826; Helix labiosa Montagu, 1803; Rissoa cornea Lovén, 1846 junior subjective synonym; Rissoa elata R. A. Philippi, 1844 junior subjective synonym; Rissoa fragilis Michaud, 1830; Rissoa grossa Michaud, 1830; Rissoa grossa var. elatopsis Mars, 1956 (infrasubspecific name); Rissoa grossa var. plicacea Mars, 1956 (nfrasubspecific name, nude name, or name published in synonymy); Rissoa labiosa (Montagu, 1803); Rissoa membranacea var. cornea (Lovén, 1846); Rissoa membranacea var. gracilis (Forbes & Hanley, 1850) (infrasubspecific name); Rissoa membranacea var. labiosa (Montagu, 1803); Rissoa membranacea var. minor Jeffreys, 1867; Rissoa membranacea var. octona auct. non Linnaeus, 1767; Rissoa oblonga Desmarest, 1814; Rissoa octona (Nilsson, 1822) junior subjective synonym (junior synonym); Rissoa plicatula (Risso, 1826) junior subjective synonym; Rissoa pontica Milaschewitsch, 1916; Rissoa venusta var. pontica Milaschewitsch, 1916 (accepted as full species); Rissostomia brunosericea Smagowicz, 1977 ·; Rissostomia membranacea (J. Adams, 1797); Rissostomia membranacea cornea (Lovén, 1846); Rissostomia membranacea labiosa (Montagu, 1803); Rissostomia membranacea octona auct. non Linnaeus, 1767; Turbo costatus Pulteney, 1799; Turbo membranaceus J. Adams, 1800; Turboella (Nititurboella) cornea (Lovén, 1846); Zippora membranacea ()J.Adams, 1800

= Rissoa membranacea =

Species of gastropod

Rissoa membranacea is a species of small sea snail, a marine gastropod mollusc or micromollusc in the family Rissoidae.

== Description ==
The length of the shell varies between 4 mm and 11 mm.

var. oblonga

var. oblonga rissoidea

== Distribution ==
This species occurs in the Atlantic Ocean from Western nOrway to the British Isles; in the Mediterranean Sea in the Alboran Sea.
