= Cerithidium australiense =

Scientific classification
- Kingdom: Animalia
- Phylum: Mollusca
- Class: Gastropoda
- Subclass: Caenogastropoda
- Order: incertae sedis
- Family: Cerithiidae
- Genus: Cerithidium
- Species: C. australiense

Binomial name
- Cerithidium australiense Thiele, 1930

Species of gastropod

Cerithidium australiense is a species of sea snail, a marine gastropod mollusk in the family Cerithiidae.
