= Rissoa euxinica =

Scientific classification
- Kingdom: Animalia
- Phylum: Mollusca
- Class: Gastropoda
- Subclass: Caenogastropoda
- Order: Littorinimorpha
- Family: Rissoidae
- Genus: Rissoa
- Species: R. euxinica

Binomial name
- Rissoa euxinica Milaschevich, 1909

Species of gastropod

Rissoa euxinica is a species of minute sea snail, a marine gastropod mollusc or micromollusc in the family Rissoidae.
