= Benthonellania fayalensis =

Scientific classification
- Kingdom: Animalia
- Phylum: Mollusca
- Class: Gastropoda
- Subclass: Caenogastropoda
- Order: Littorinimorpha
- Family: Rissoidae
- Genus: Benthonellania
- Species: B. fayalensis

Binomial name
- Benthonellania fayalensis (Watson, 1886)

Species of gastropod

Benthonellania fayalensis is a species of minute sea snail, a marine gastropod mollusk or micromollusk in the family Rissoidae.
