= Hoplopteron =

Scientific classification
- Kingdom: Animalia
- Phylum: Mollusca
- Class: Gastropoda
- Subclass: Caenogastropoda
- Order: Littorinimorpha
- Family: Eulimidae
- Genus: Hoplopteron; P. Fischer, 1876

Genus of gastropods

Hoplopteron is a small genus of sea snails, marine gastropod mollusks in the family Eulimidae.

== Species ==
Species within this genus include the following:

- Hoplopteron alifera (Thiele, 1925)
- Hoplopteron terquemi (P. Fischer, 1876)
