= Rissoa alleryi =

Scientific classification
- Kingdom: Animalia
- Phylum: Mollusca
- Class: Gastropoda
- Subclass: Caenogastropoda
- Order: Littorinimorpha
- Family: Rissoidae
- Genus: Rissoa
- Species: R. alleryi

Binomial name
- Rissoa alleryi (Nordsieck, 1972)

Species of gastropod

Rissoa alleryi is a species of small sea snail, a marine gastropod mollusc or micromollusc in the family Rissoidae.
