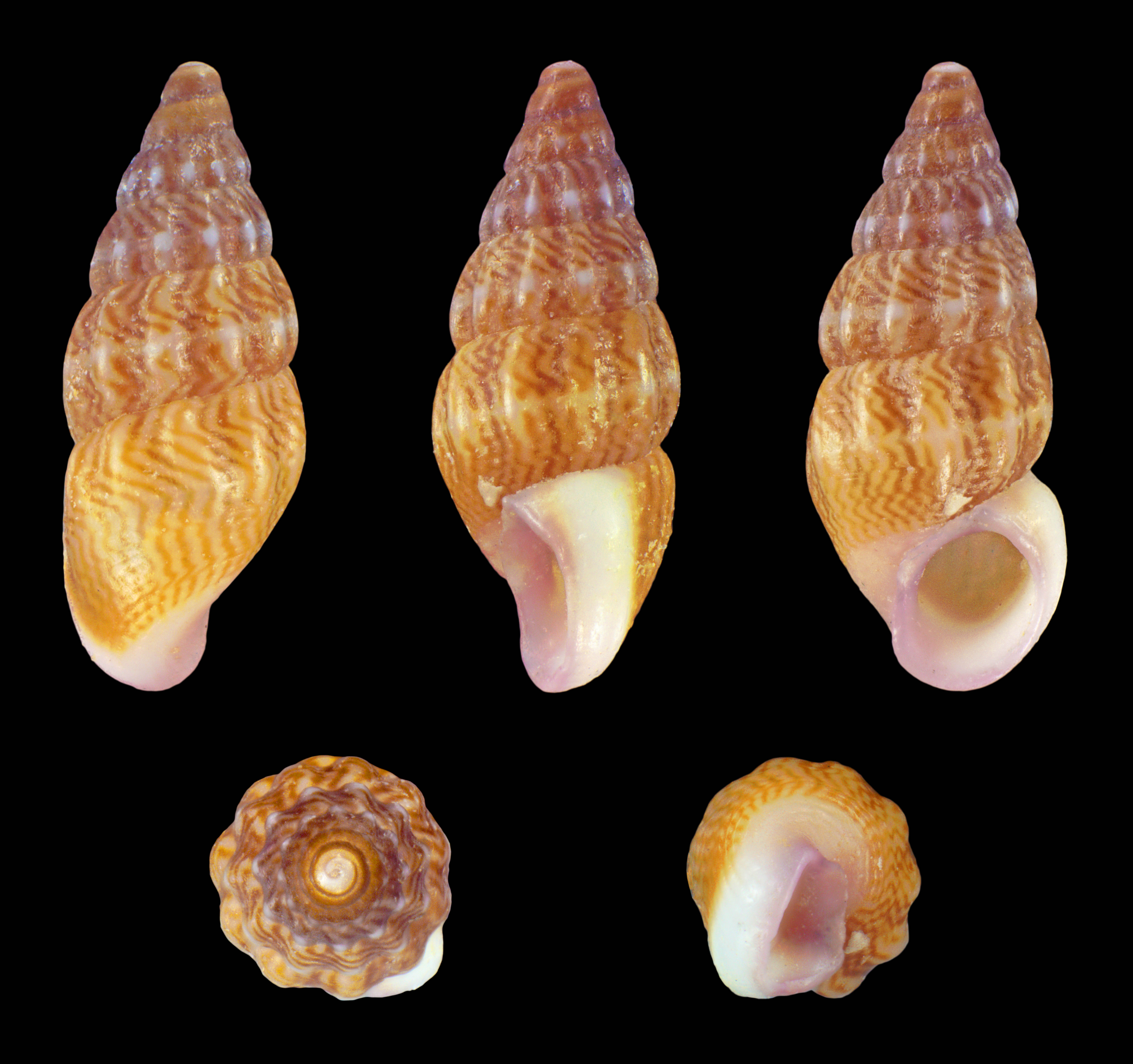

Scientific classification
- Kingdom: Animalia
- Phylum: Mollusca
- Class: Gastropoda
- Subclass: Caenogastropoda
- Order: Littorinimorpha
- Family: Rissoidae
- Genus: Rissoa
- Species: R. guerinii

Binomial name
- Rissoa guerinii Récluz, 1843

Synonyms
- Rissoa costulata Alder, 1844; Rissoa subcostulata Schwartz, 1864<

= Rissoa guerinii =

Species of gastropod

Rissoa guerinii is a species of small sea snail, a marine gastropod mollusc or micromollusc in the family Rissoidae.
