= Cerithidium liratum =

Scientific classification
- Kingdom: Animalia
- Phylum: Mollusca
- Class: Gastropoda
- Subclass: Caenogastropoda
- Order: incertae sedis
- Family: Cerithiidae
- Genus: Cerithidium
- Species: C. liratum

Binomial name
- Cerithidium liratum Thiele, 1930

Species of gastropod

Cerithidium liratum is a species of sea snail, a marine gastropod mollusk in the family Cerithiidae.
