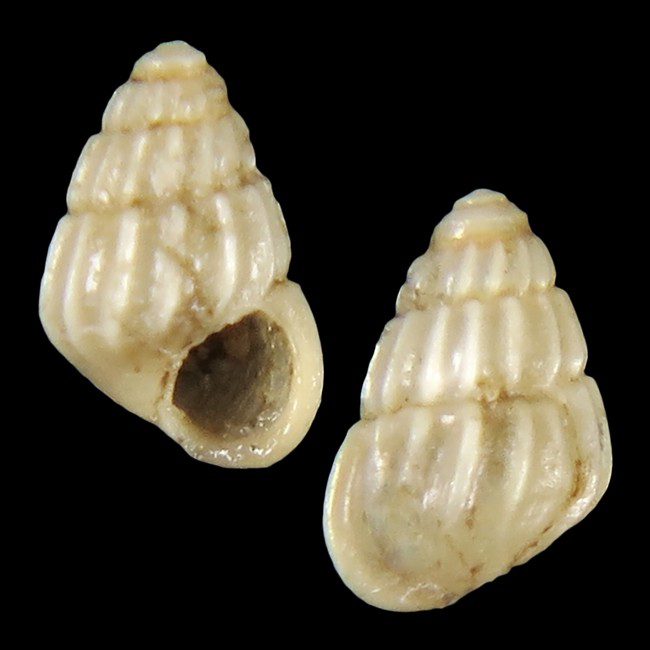

Scientific classification
- Kingdom: Animalia
- Phylum: Mollusca
- Class: Gastropoda
- Subclass: Caenogastropoda
- Order: Littorinimorpha
- Family: Rissoidae
- Genus: Rissoa
- Species: R. olangoensis

Binomial name
- Rissoa olangoensis Poppe, Tagaro & Stahlschmidt, 2015

= Rissoa olangoensis =

Species of gastropod

Rissoa olangoensis is a species of sea snail, a marine gastropod mollusc in the family Rissoidae. The species was originally found by fishermen in the Philippines, who were interested in shelled mollusks. The fishermen took pictures of it.

== Description ==
The length of the shell attains 2.2 mm.

== Distribution ==
This marine species occurs off the Philippines.

== Original description ==
- Poppe G.T., Tagaro S.P. & Stahlschmidt P. (2015). New shelled molluscan species from the central Philippines I. Visaya. 4(3): 15–59. page(s): 24, pl. 8 figs 1–3.
