= Rissoa panhormensis =

Scientific classification
- Kingdom: Animalia
- Phylum: Mollusca
- Class: Gastropoda
- Subclass: Caenogastropoda
- Order: Littorinimorpha
- Family: Rissoidae
- Genus: Rissoa
- Species: R. panhormensis

Binomial name
- Rissoa panhormensis Verduin, 1985

Species of gastropod

Rissoa panhormensis is a species of minute sea snail, a marine gastropod mollusc or micromollusc in the family Rissoidae.
