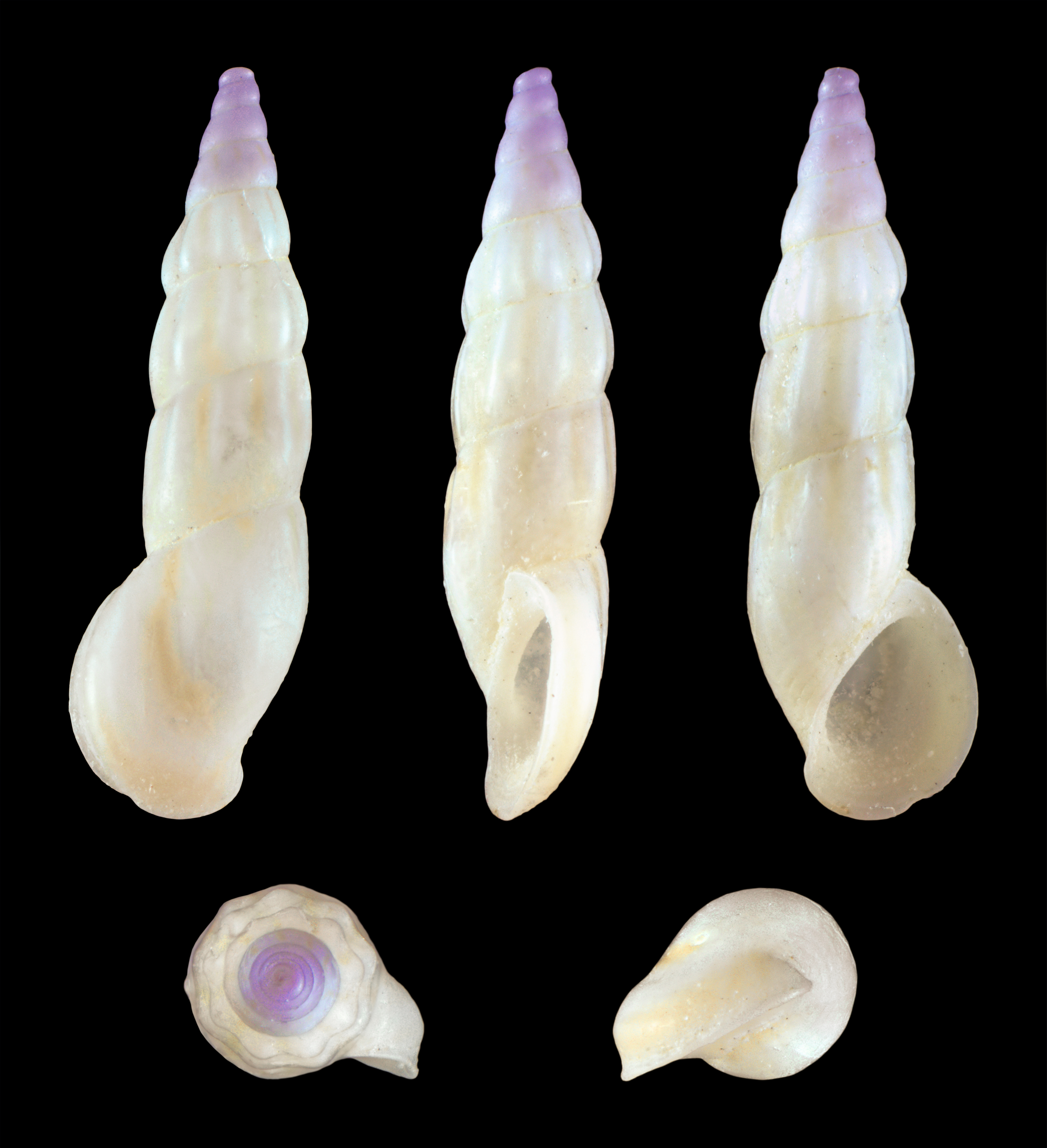

Scientific classification
- Kingdom: Animalia
- Phylum: Mollusca
- Class: Gastropoda
- Subclass: Caenogastropoda
- Order: Littorinimorpha
- Family: Rissoidae
- Genus: Rissoa
- Species: R. auriscalpium

Binomial name
- Rissoa auriscalpium (Linnaeus, 1758)

= Rissoa auriscalpium =

Species of gastropod

Rissoa auriscalpium, common name the golden-capped risso, is a species of small sea snail, a marine gastropod mollusc or micromollusc in the family Rissoidae.
