= Benthonellania precipitata =

Scientific classification
- Kingdom: Animalia
- Phylum: Mollusca
- Class: Gastropoda
- Subclass: Caenogastropoda
- Order: Littorinimorpha
- Superfamily: Rissooidea
- Family: Rissoidae
- Genus: Benthonellania
- Species: B. precipitata

Binomial name
- Benthonellania precipitata (Dall, 1889)

Synonyms
- Alvania precipitata (Dall, 1889) superseded combination; Rissoa precipitata Dall, 1889 (original combination)

Species of gastropod

Benthonellania precipitata is a species of small sea snail, a marine gastropod mollusc or micromollusk in the family Rissoidae.

== Description ==
The maximum recorded shell length is 4 mm.

== Habitat ==
Minimum recorded depth is 55 m. Maximum recorded depth is 1225 m.
