= Rissoa lia =

Scientific classification
- Kingdom: Animalia
- Phylum: Mollusca
- Class: Gastropoda
- Subclass: Caenogastropoda
- Order: Littorinimorpha
- Family: Rissoidae
- Genus: Rissoa
- Species: R. lia

Binomial name
- Rissoa lia (Monterosato, 1884)

Species of gastropod

Rissoa lia is a species of small sea snail, a marine gastropod mollusc or micromollusc in the family Rissoidae.
