= Cerithidium diplax =

Scientific classification
- Kingdom: Animalia
- Phylum: Mollusca
- Class: Gastropoda
- Subclass: Caenogastropoda
- Order: incertae sedis
- Family: Cerithiidae
- Genus: Cerithidium
- Species: C. diplax

Binomial name
- Cerithidium diplax (Watson, 1886)

Synonyms
- Bittium diplax Watson, 1886; Clathrofenella diplax (Watson, 1886); Clathrofenella ferruginea (Adams A., 1860) (misidentification)

Species of gastropod

Cerithidium diplax is a species of sea snail, a marine gastropod mollusk in the family Cerithiidae.

== Distribution ==
This species is distributed in the Mediterranean Sea and along Queensland, Australia
