= Rissoa pseudoguerini =

Scientific classification
- Kingdom: Animalia
- Phylum: Mollusca
- Class: Gastropoda
- Subclass: Caenogastropoda
- Order: Littorinimorpha
- Family: Rissoidae
- Genus: Rissoa
- Species: R. pseudoguerini

Binomial name
- Rissoa pseudoguerini (Nordsieck & Talavera, 1979)

Species of gastropod

Rissoa pseudoguerini is a species of minute sea snail, a marine gastropod mollusc or micromollusc in the family Rissoidae.
