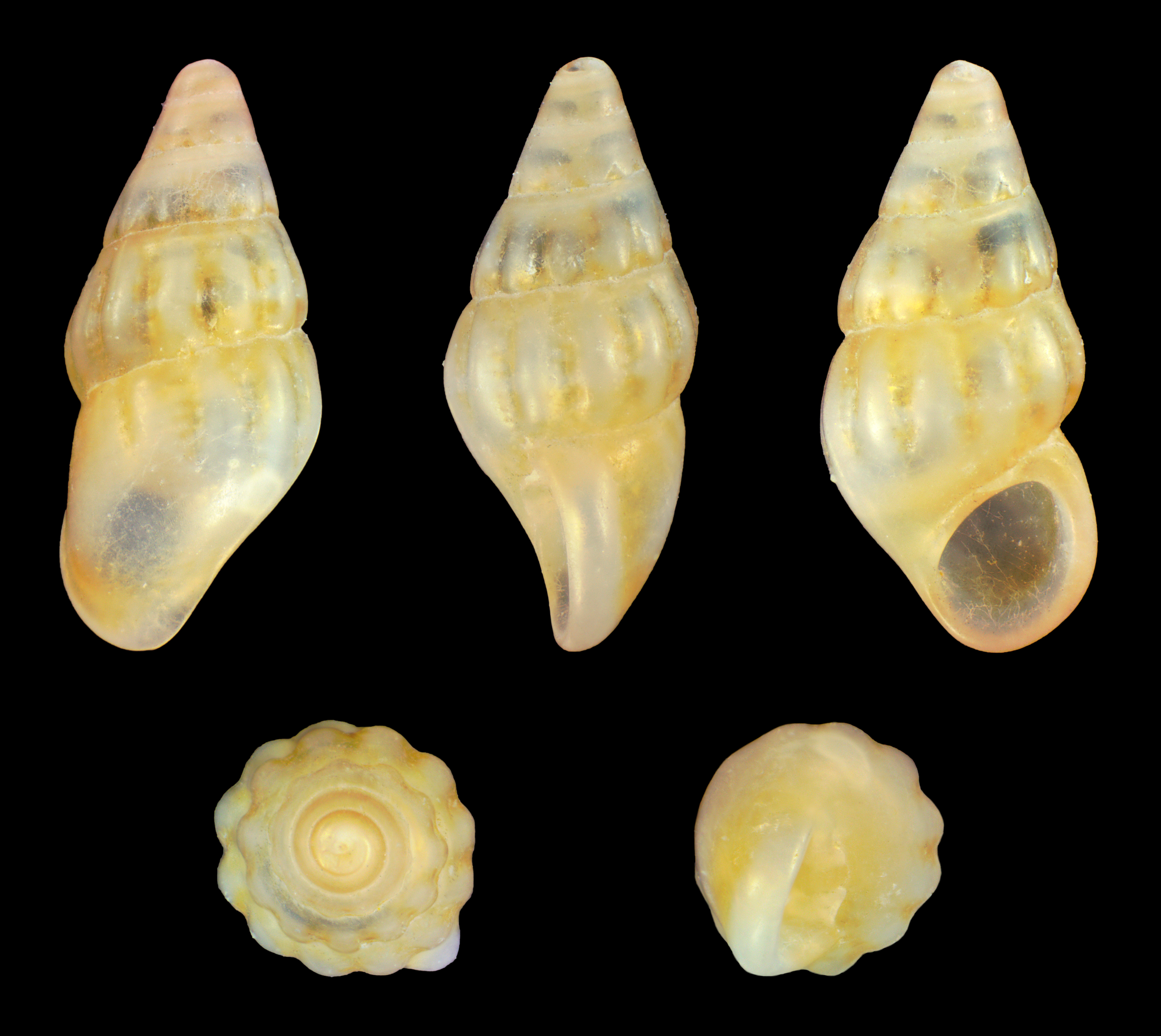

Scientific classification
- Kingdom: Animalia
- Phylum: Mollusca
- Class: Gastropoda
- Subclass: Caenogastropoda
- Order: Littorinimorpha
- Family: Rissoidae
- Genus: Rissoa
- Species: R. gomerica

Binomial name
- Rissoa gomerica (Nordsieck & Talavera, 1979)

Synonyms
- Sfaxiella gomerica Nordsieck & Talavera, 1979

= Rissoa gomerica =

Species of gastropod

Rissoa gomerica is a species of small sea snail, a marine gastropod mollusc or micromollusc in the family Rissoidae.

== Distribution ==
This species occurs in the North Atlantic Ocean.
