= Benthonellania colombiana =

Scientific classification
- Kingdom: Animalia
- Phylum: Mollusca
- Class: Gastropoda
- Subclass: Caenogastropoda
- Order: Littorinimorpha
- Superfamily: Rissooidea
- Family: Rissoidae
- Genus: Benthonellania
- Species: B. colombiana

Binomial name
- Benthonellania colombiana Romer & Moore, 1988

Synonyms
- Alvania colombiana Romer & D. R. Moore, 1988 (original combination)

Species of gastropod

Benthonellania colombiana is a species of minute sea snail, a marine gastropod mollusk or micromollusk in the family Rissoidae.

== Description ==
The maximum recorded shell length is 1.3 mm.

== Habitat ==
Minimum recorded depth is 45 m. Maximum recorded depth is 221 m.
