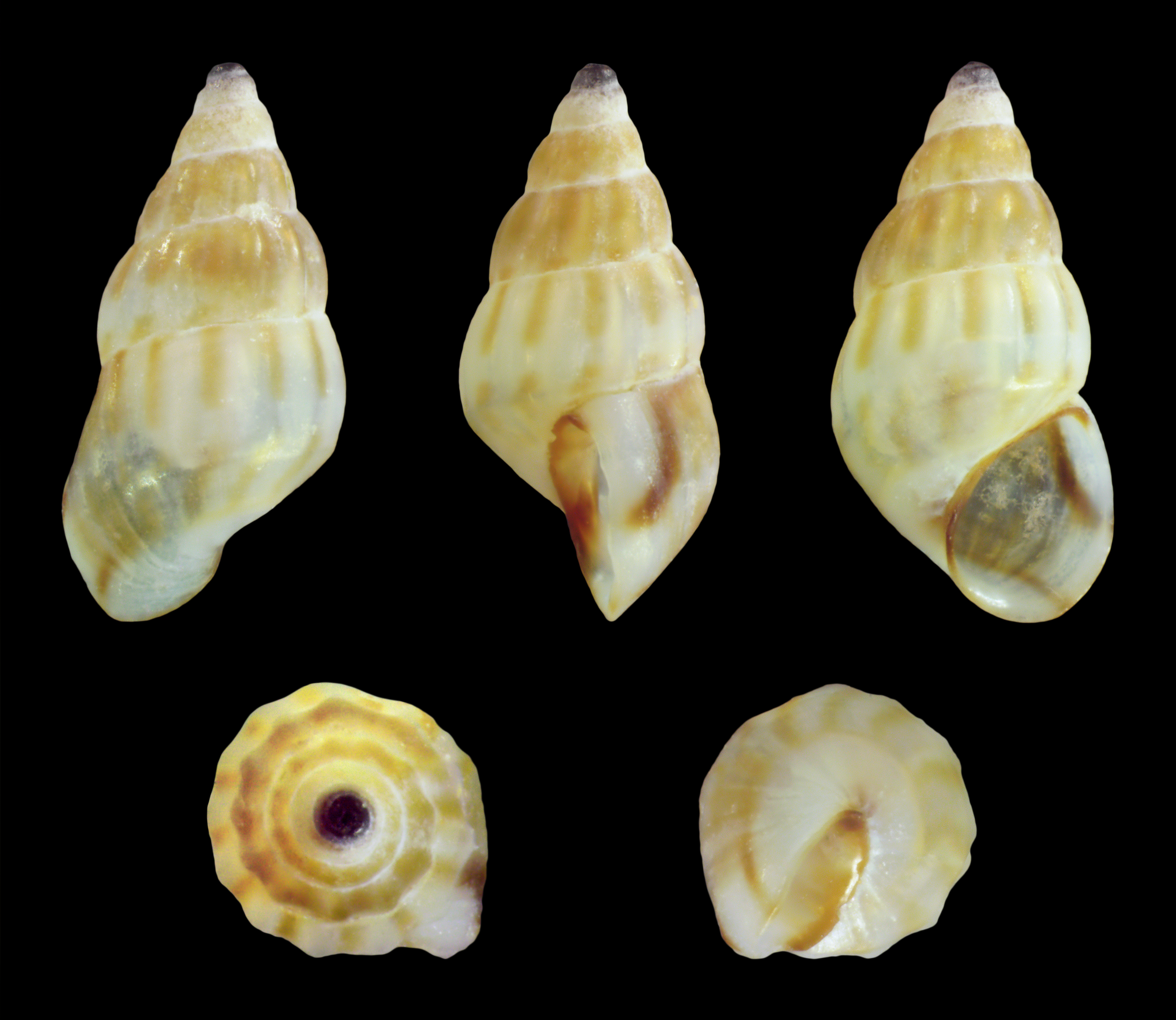

Scientific classification
- Kingdom: Animalia
- Phylum: Mollusca
- Class: Gastropoda
- Subclass: Caenogastropoda
- Order: Littorinimorpha
- Family: Rissoidae
- Genus: Rissoa
- Species: R. parva

Binomial name
- Rissoa parva (da Costa, 1778)

Synonyms
- Cingula parva (da Costa, 1778); Pusillina parva (da Costa, 1778); Rissoa cerasina Brusina, 1866; Rissoa edgariana Melvill & Standen, 1907; Rissoa interrupta (J. Adams, 1800); Rissoa interrupta var. bifasciata Sars G.O., 1878; Rissoa matoniana Récluz, 1843; Rissoa parva var. exilis Jeffreys, 1867; Rissoa parva var. interrupta (J. Adams, 1798); Rissoa semicostulata Anton, 1838; Rissoia edgariana Melvill & Standen, 1907; Turbo aereus Adams J., 1797; Turbo albus Adams J., 1797; Turbo interruptus Adams J., 1800; Turbo lacteus Donovan, 1804; Turbo parvus da Costa, 1778; Turbo subluteus Adams J., 1797; Turboella interrupta (J. Adams, 1800); Turboella parva

= Rissoa parva =

Species of gastropod

Rissoa parva is a species of small sea snail, a marine gastropod mollusc or micromollusc in the family Rissoidae.

== Taxonomy ==
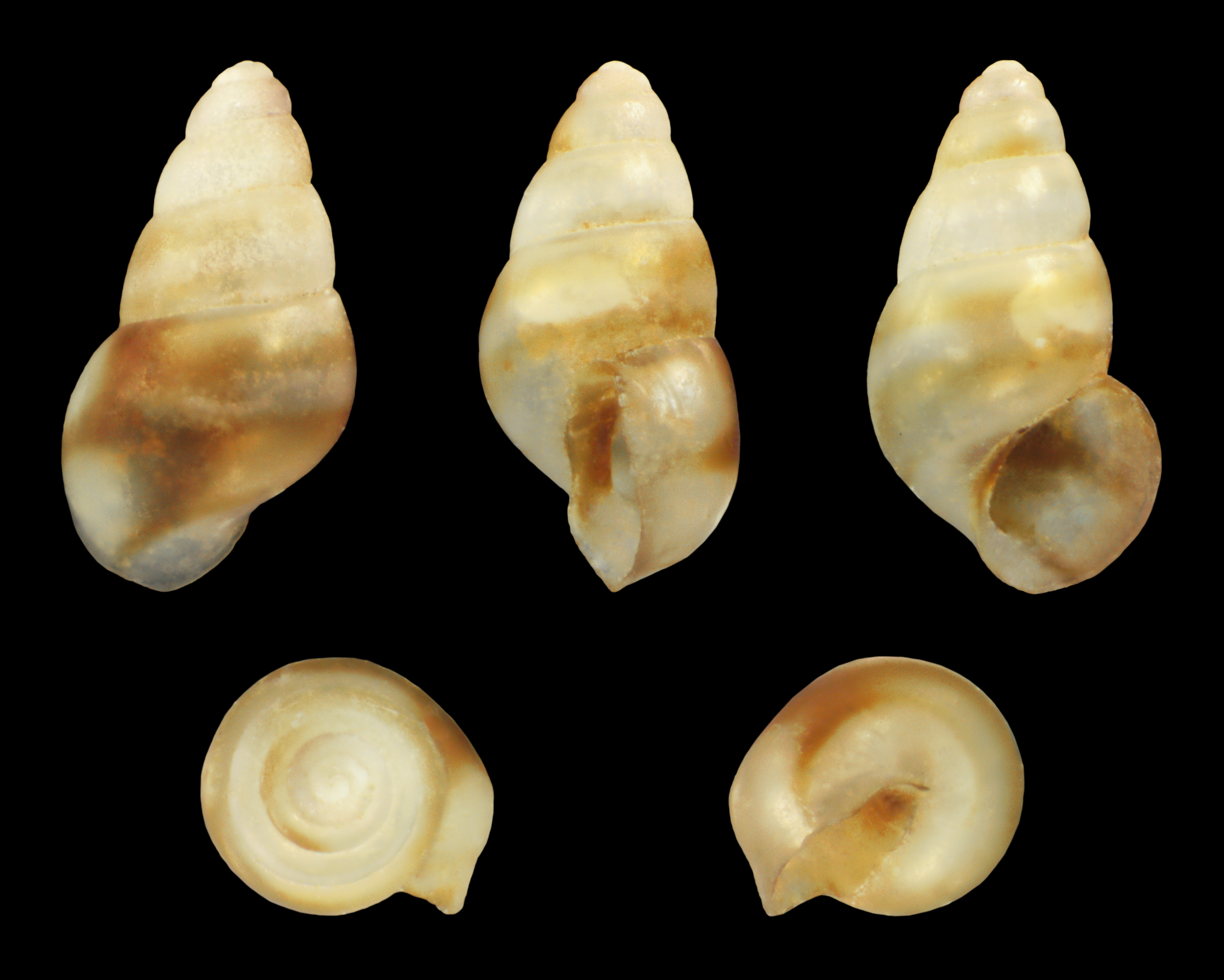
Rissoa parva ssp. interrupta var. bifasciata

The status of R. interrupta in relation to R. parva is still a point of discussion. Based on research of Wigham (1975), R. interrupta is considered by many authors as a variety of form of R. parva (Fretter & Graham, 1778; McKay & Smith, 1979). Nordsieck (1968) and Verduin (1976) think however that R. interrupta and R. parva are two different species. Both species have a sympatric appearance.

== Distribution ==
This species occurs in European waters, the Mediterranean Sea and the Black Sea. Fossils have been found in Quaternary strata of Rhodos, Greece.
