= Rissoa angustior =

Scientific classification
- Kingdom: Animalia
- Phylum: Mollusca
- Class: Gastropoda
- Subclass: Caenogastropoda
- Order: Littorinimorpha
- Family: Rissoidae
- Genus: Rissoa
- Species: R. angustior

Binomial name
- Rissoa angustior (Monterosato, 1917)

Species of gastropod

Rissoa angustior is a species of small sea snail, a marine gastropod mollusc or micromollusc in the family Rissoidae.
