= Benthonellania agastachys =

Scientific classification
- Kingdom: Animalia
- Phylum: Mollusca
- Class: Gastropoda
- Subclass: Caenogastropoda
- Order: Littorinimorpha
- Family: Rissoidae
- Genus: Benthonellania
- Species: B. agastachys

Binomial name
- Benthonellania agastachys Bouchet & Warén, 1993

Species of gastropod

Benthonellania agastachys is a species of minute sea snail, a marine gastropod mollusc or micromollusc in the family Rissoidae.
