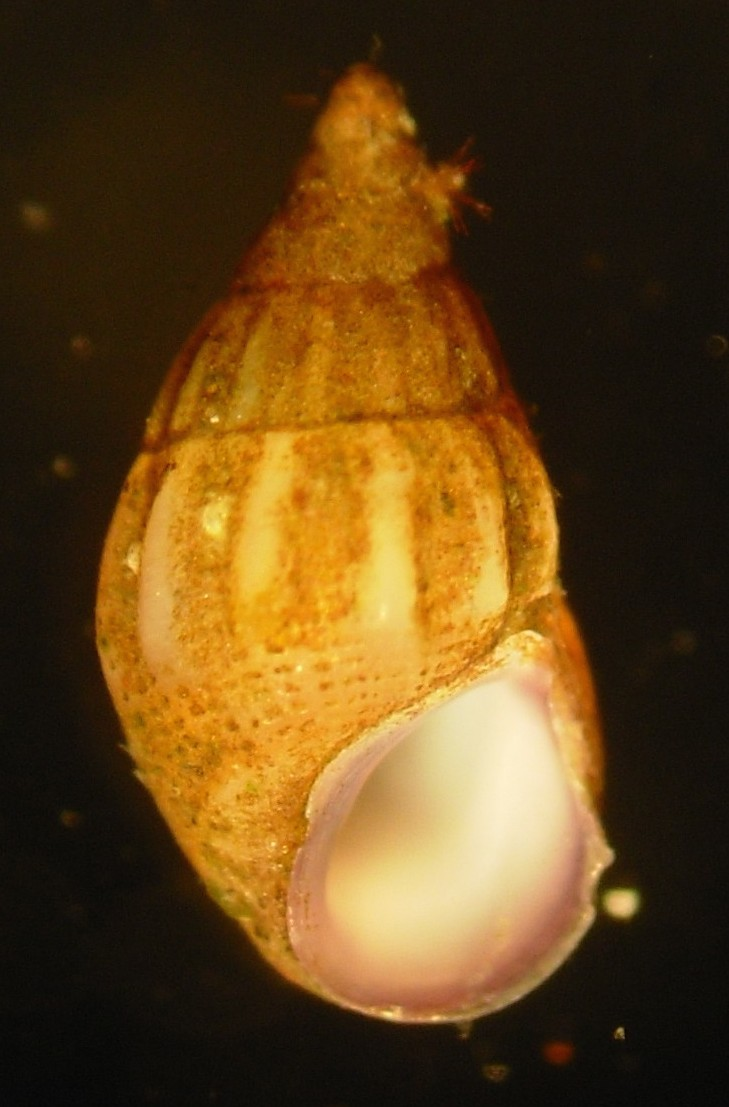
- Rissoa lilacina shell

Scientific classification
- Kingdom: Animalia
- Phylum: Mollusca
- Class: Gastropoda
- Subclass: Caenogastropoda
- Order: Littorinimorpha
- Family: Rissoidae
- Genus: Rissoa
- Species: R. lilacina

Binomial name
- Rissoa lilacina Récluz, 1843

Synonyms
- Cingula parva var. rufilabris Thorpe, 1844; Lilacinia violacea canariensis F. Nordsieck & García-Talavera, 1979 (dubious syn.); Rissoa albella rufilabrum Alder, 1844 ·; Rissoa lilacina porifera; Rissoa lilacina rufilabrum; Rissoa porifera (Lovén, 1846); Rissoa punctata Potiez & Michaud, 1838; Rissoa rufilabris (Thorpe, 1844) d; Rissoa rufilabrum Alder, 1844; Rissoa violacea var. ecostata Jeffreys, 1867; Rissoia rufilabrata Locard, 1886

= Rissoa lilacina =

Species of gastropod

Rissoa lilacina is a species of small sea snail, a marine gastropod mollusc or micromollusc in the family Rissoidae.

== Distribution ==
This marine species occurs at the south coast of the Channel in Calvados and Finistère, France
