= Rissoa verdensis =

Scientific classification
- Kingdom: Animalia
- Phylum: Mollusca
- Class: Gastropoda
- Subclass: Caenogastropoda
- Order: Littorinimorpha
- Family: Rissoidae
- Genus: Rissoa
- Species: R. verdensis

Binomial name
- Rissoa verdensis Rolán & Oliveira, 2008

Species of gastropod

Rissoa verdensis is a species of minute sea snail, a marine gastropod mollusk or micromollusk in the family Rissoidae.

== Distribution ==
This species can be found in the Atlantic Ocean off the Cape Verde islands.
