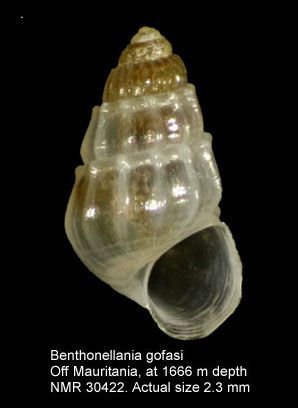
- Benthonellania gofasi

Scientific classification
- Kingdom: Animalia
- Phylum: Mollusca
- Class: Gastropoda
- Subclass: Caenogastropoda
- Order: Littorinimorpha
- Superfamily: Rissooidea
- Family: Rissoidae
- Genus: Benthonellania; Lozouet, 1990

Type species
- Benthonellania gofasi Lozouet, 1990

= Benthonellania =

Genus of gastropods

Benthonellania is a genus of minute sea snails, marine gastropod mollusks or micromollusks in the family Rissoidae.

== Species ==
Species within the genus Benthonellania include:

- Benthonellania acuticostata (Dall, 1889)
- Benthonellania aequatorialis (Thiele, 1925)
- Benthonellania africana (Thiele, 1925)
- Benthonellania agastachys Bouchet & Warén, 1993
- Benthonellania alis Amati, Di Giulio & Oliverio, 2022
- Benthonellania alvanioides J. D. Oliver & Rolán, 2017
- † Benthonellania antepelagica Lozouet, 1990 †
- † Benthonellania benestarensis Vazzana, 1997
- Benthonellania bouteti Amati, Di Giulio & Oliverio, 2022
- Benthonellania charope (Melvill & Standen, 1901)
- Benthonellania colombiana (Romer & D. R. Moore, 1988)
- Benthonellania coronata Absalão & Santos, 2004
- Benthonellania donmoorei Moolenbeek & Faber, 1991
- Benthonellania fayalensis (Watson, 1886)
- Benthonellania gofasi Lozouet, 1990
- Benthonellania hertzogi (Thiele, 1925)
- Benthonellania listera (Dall, 1927)
- Benthonellania lozoueti Amati, Di Giulio & Oliverio, 2022
- Benthonellania maestratii Amati, Di Giulio & Oliverio, 2022
- Benthonellania megan Amati, Di Giulio & Oliverio, 2022
- Benthonellania multicostata Absalão & Santos, 2004
- Benthonellania oligostigma Bouchet & Warén, 1993
- † Benthonellania praexanthias Lozouet, 1990
- Benthonellania precipitata (Dall, 1889)
- Benthonellania profundior (Hedley, 1907)
- Benthonellania pyrrhias (Watson, 1886)
- Benthonellania tarava Amati, Di Giulio & Oliverio, 2022
- Benthonellania thielei Amati, Di Giulio & Oliverio, 2022
- Benthonellania tuamotu Amati, Di Giulio & Oliverio, 2022
- Benthonellania xanthias (Watson, 1886)
