= Benthonellania pyrrhias =

Scientific classification
- Kingdom: Animalia
- Phylum: Mollusca
- Class: Gastropoda
- Subclass: Caenogastropoda
- Order: Littorinimorpha
- Family: Rissoidae
- Genus: Benthonellania
- Species: B. pyrrhias

Binomial name
- Benthonellania pyrrhias (Watson, 1886)

Species of gastropod

Benthonellania pyrrhias is a species of minute sea snail, a marine gastropod mollusk or micromollusk in the family Rissoidae.

== Description ==
The maximum recorded shell length is 2.9 mm.

== Habitat ==
Minimum recorded depth is 713 m. Maximum recorded depth is 1426 m.
