= Cerithidium perparvulum =

Scientific classification
- Kingdom: Animalia
- Phylum: Mollusca
- Class: Gastropoda
- Subclass: Caenogastropoda
- Order: incertae sedis
- Family: Cerithiidae
- Genus: Cerithidium
- Species: C. perparvulum

Binomial name
- Cerithidium perparvulum (Watson, 1886)

Synonyms
- Alvania acuminata Gould, 1861 (dubious synonym); Alvania cerithina (Philippi, 1849) (Does not belong to the genus Alvania); Bittium perparvulum Watson, 1886; Clathrofenella perparvula (Watson, 1886); † Fenella kenonis Yokoyama, 1924; † Fenella shinonis Yokoyama, 1924; Finella perparvula (Watson, 1886); Obtortio perparvula (Watson, 1886); Rissoa cerithina Philippi, 1849 (dubious synonym)

Species of gastropod

Cerithidium perparvulum is a species of sea snail, a marine gastropod mollusk in the family Cerithiidae.
