= Onoba steineni =

Scientific classification
- Kingdom: Animalia
- Phylum: Mollusca
- Class: Gastropoda
- Subclass: Caenogastropoda
- Order: Littorinimorpha
- Family: Rissoidae
- Genus: Onoba
- Species: O. steineni

Binomial name
- Onoba steineni (Strebel, 1908)

Synonyms
- Rissoa studeriana Thiele, 1912; Rissoa valdiviae Thiele, 1925; Rissoia steineni Strebel, 1908 (basionym)

Species of gastropod

Onoba steineni is a species of small sea snail, a marine gastropod mollusk or micromollusk in the family Rissoidae.

== Description ==
The maximum recorded shell length is 3.5 mm.

== Habitat ==
Minimum recorded depth is 20 m. Maximum recorded depth is 94 m.
