= Benthonellania xanthias =

Scientific classification
- Kingdom: Animalia
- Phylum: Mollusca
- Class: Gastropoda
- Subclass: Caenogastropoda
- Order: Littorinimorpha
- Family: Rissoidae
- Genus: Benthonellania
- Species: B. xanthias

Binomial name
- Benthonellania xanthias (Watson, 1886)

Species of gastropod

Benthonellania xanthias is a species of minute sea snail, a marine gastropod mollusk or micromollusk in the family Rissoidae.

== Description ==
The maximum recorded shell length is 2.1 mm.

== Habitat ==
Minimum recorded depth is 58 m. Maximum recorded depth is 1750 m.
