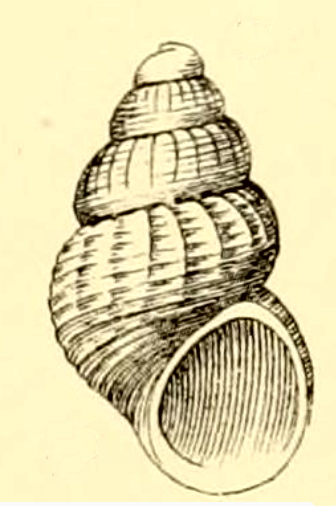
- Drawing of a shell of Alvania syngenes (holotype)

Scientific classification
- Kingdom: Animalia
- Phylum: Mollusca
- Class: Gastropoda
- Subclass: Caenogastropoda
- Order: Littorinimorpha
- Family: Rissoidae
- Genus: Alvania
- Species: A. syngenes

Binomial name
- Alvania syngenes (A. E. Verrill, 1884)

Synonyms
- Cingula syngenes A. E. Verrill, 1884 (basionym, taxon does not belong to Cingula); Rissoa syngenes (A. E. Verril, 1884)<

= Alvania syngenes =

Species of gastropod

Alvania syngenes is a species of minute sea snail, a marine gastropod mollusk or micromollusk in the family Rissoidae.

== Distribution ==
This species occurs in the Atlantic Ocean off North Carolina, USA.

== Description ==
The maximum recorded shell length is 3 mm, its diameter 1.6 mm.

(Original description) The small shell is white, long-ovate, with a regularly tapering, blunt-tipped spire. It shows a strongly impressed suture and four to five evenly convex whorls. These are rather finely and regularly reticulated by transverse ribs and revolving cinguli of nearly equal strength, except on the base, which has only the spiral sculpture. The apical whorls are relatively large, obtusely rounded and nearly smooth. On the second whorl a few revolving lines appear. The lower whorls are crossed by about fourteen to sixteen, regular, rather elevated, but not broad, rounded ribs, which are nearly straight and separated by pretty regular interspaces, usually about twice as broad as the ribs. On all except the body whorl, the ribs extend from suture to suture. On the body whorl they fade out a little below the periphery. The whole shell, except the nucleus, is covered with well developed, rather thin, revolving cinguli, which are about the same height as the ribs, though rather thinner, but in crossing the ribs they do not form nodules, so that the surface is cancellated with a regular network, of which the meshes are squarish, or elongated in the direction of the revolving lines, but below the periphery of the body whorl the cinguli become stronger and the ribs fainter, while the greater part of the base is occupied with cinguli only, which are here rather closely crowded. On the penultimate whorl there are about six or seven cinguli. On the body whorl there are sixteen to nineteen, of which eight or nine are posterior to the lip, and six or seven anterior to it. The surface is also marked with very fine revolving striae, visible under the microscope. There is no umbilicus. The aperture is rounded or very broadly ovate, usually slightly narrowed and obtusely angled posteriorly, broadly rounded and slightly flaring in front. The outer lip is sometimes thin and sharp, sometimes distinctly thickened, but without a varix. Anteriorly it is slightly effuse, and sometimes forms there a faint rounded angle. The inner lip is continuous, forming a regular curve, but not quite so convex as the outer margin. The portion in contact with the body whorl has a free edge, and in the umbilical region the margin is a little reflexed, often leaving a slight furrow beneath it.

== Habitat ==
Minimum recorded depth is 260 m. Maximum recorded depth is 538 m.
