= Powellisetia pelseneeri =

Scientific classification
- Kingdom: Animalia
- Phylum: Mollusca
- Class: Gastropoda
- Subclass: Caenogastropoda
- Order: Littorinimorpha
- Family: Rissoidae
- Genus: Powellisetia
- Species: P. pelseneeri

Binomial name
- Powellisetia pelseneeri (Thiele, 1912)

Species of gastropod

Powellisetia pelseneeri is a species of small sea snail, a marine gastropod mollusk or micromollusk in the family Rissoidae.

They are detritivores and reproduce sexually.
