= Onoba kergueleni =

Scientific classification
- Kingdom: Animalia
- Phylum: Mollusca
- Class: Gastropoda
- Subclass: Caenogastropoda
- Order: Littorinimorpha
- Family: Rissoidae
- Genus: Onoba
- Species: O. kergueleni

Binomial name
- Onoba kergueleni (Smith, 1875)

Synonyms
- Onoba (Ovirissoa) kergueleni (E. A. Smith, 1875); Ovirissoa adarensis (E.A. Smith, 1902); Rissoa adarensis E.A. Smith, 1902; Rissoa columna Pelseneer, 1903 (uncertain synonym; shell of holotype destroyed by acidic alcohol); Rissoa kergueleni E. A. Smith, 1875 (original combination); Rissoa observationis Thiele, 1912

Species of gastropod

Onoba kergueleni is a species of small sea snail, a marine gastropod mollusk or micromollusk in the family Rissoidae.

== Description ==
The maximum recorded shell length is 3.11 mm.

== Habitat ==
Minimum recorded depth is 27 m. Maximum recorded depth is 480 m.
