= Melanella eulimoides =

Scientific classification
- Kingdom: Animalia
- Phylum: Mollusca
- Class: Gastropoda
- Subclass: Caenogastropoda
- Order: Littorinimorpha
- Family: Eulimidae
- Genus: Melanella
- Species: M. eulimoides

Binomial name
- Melanella eulimoides (C. B. Adams, 1850)

Synonyms
- Rissoa eulimoides C. B. Adams, 1850

Species of gastropod

co

Melanella eulimoides, common name the grooved eulima, is a species of sea snail, a marine gastropod mollusk in the family Eulimidae. The species is one of a number within the genus Melanella.

== Description ==
(Original description) The elongate-conic shell is white, and translucent, with a spiral line below the suture. It is smooth and shining, and each whorl bears a broad, very obtuse varix that forms a slightly oblique line with the outer lip. The apex is rather obtuse. The spire has a moderately curved axis, which is convex on the left side and rectilinear on the right. There are seven or eight whorls, which are scarcely convex and are separated by a lightly impressed suture. The aperture is scarcely effuse. The outer lip is well excurved, not advanced, and moderately thickened.

== Distribution ==
This marine species was originally found off Jamaica. It occurs in the Caribbean Sea and off the Bahamas and Brazil.
