= Benthonellania acuticostata =

Scientific classification
- Kingdom: Animalia
- Phylum: Mollusca
- Class: Gastropoda
- Subclass: Caenogastropoda
- Order: Littorinimorpha
- Family: Rissoidae
- Genus: Benthonellania
- Species: B. acuticostata

Binomial name
- Benthonellania acuticostata (Dall, 1889)

Synonyms
- Rissoa xanthias var. acuticostata Dall, 1889 (basionym)

Species of gastropod

Benthonellania acuticostata is a species of small sea snail, a marine gastropod mollusc or micromollusc in the family Rissoidae.

== Distribution ==
This species occurs in the Caribbean Sea, the Gulf of Mexico and the Lesser Antilles.

== Description ==
The maximum recorded shell length is 3.7 mm.

== Habitat ==
Minimum recorded depth is 59 m. Maximum recorded depth is 1249 m.
