= Alvania monserratensis =

Scientific classification
- Kingdom: Animalia
- Phylum: Mollusca
- Class: Gastropoda
- Subclass: Caenogastropoda
- Order: Littorinimorpha
- Superfamily: Rissooidea
- Family: Rissoidae
- Genus: Alvania
- Species: A. monserratensis

Binomial name
- Alvania monserratensis F. Baker, G. D. Hanna & A. M. Strong, 1930

Synonyms
- Alvania keeleri Palazzi, 1978; Alvinia inconspicua (C. B. Adams, 1852); Alvinia monserratensis F. Baker, G. D. Hanna & A. M. Strong, 1930; Rissoa inconspicua C. B. Adams, 1852 (invalid: junior homonym of Rissoa inconspicua Alder, 1844; Alvania keeleri Palazzi, 1978, is a replacement name)

Species of gastropod

Alvania monserratensis is a species of small sea snail, a marine gastropod mollusk or micromollusk in the family Rissoidae.. This species was first described in 1930 by the malacologists Dallas Hanna, Fred Baker and McClure Strong.

== Taxonomy ==
This and other Western American species were attributed to Alvinia Monterosato, 1884, following Keen (1971); nevertheless it is not proved to be more related to the Mediterranean type species Alvania weinkauffi Weinkauff, 1868 than to other Alvania s.l. and is therefore retained in Alvania.

== Description ==
The length of the shell varies between 1 mm and 2 mm.

== Distribution ==
This species occurs off the Monserate Island, Gulf of California; also off the Galapagos Islands
