= Hoplopteron alifera =

Scientific classification
- Kingdom: Animalia
- Phylum: Mollusca
- Class: Gastropoda
- Subclass: Caenogastropoda
- Order: Littorinimorpha
- Family: Eulimidae
- Genus: Hoplopteron
- Species: H. alifera

Binomial name
- Hoplopteron alifera Thiele, 1925

Synonyms
- Rissoa alifera Thiele, 1925

Species of gastropod

Hoplopteron alifera is a species of sea snail, a marine gastropod mollusk in the family Eulimidae. This species, along with Hoplopteron terquemi, belongs in the genus, Hoplopteron.
