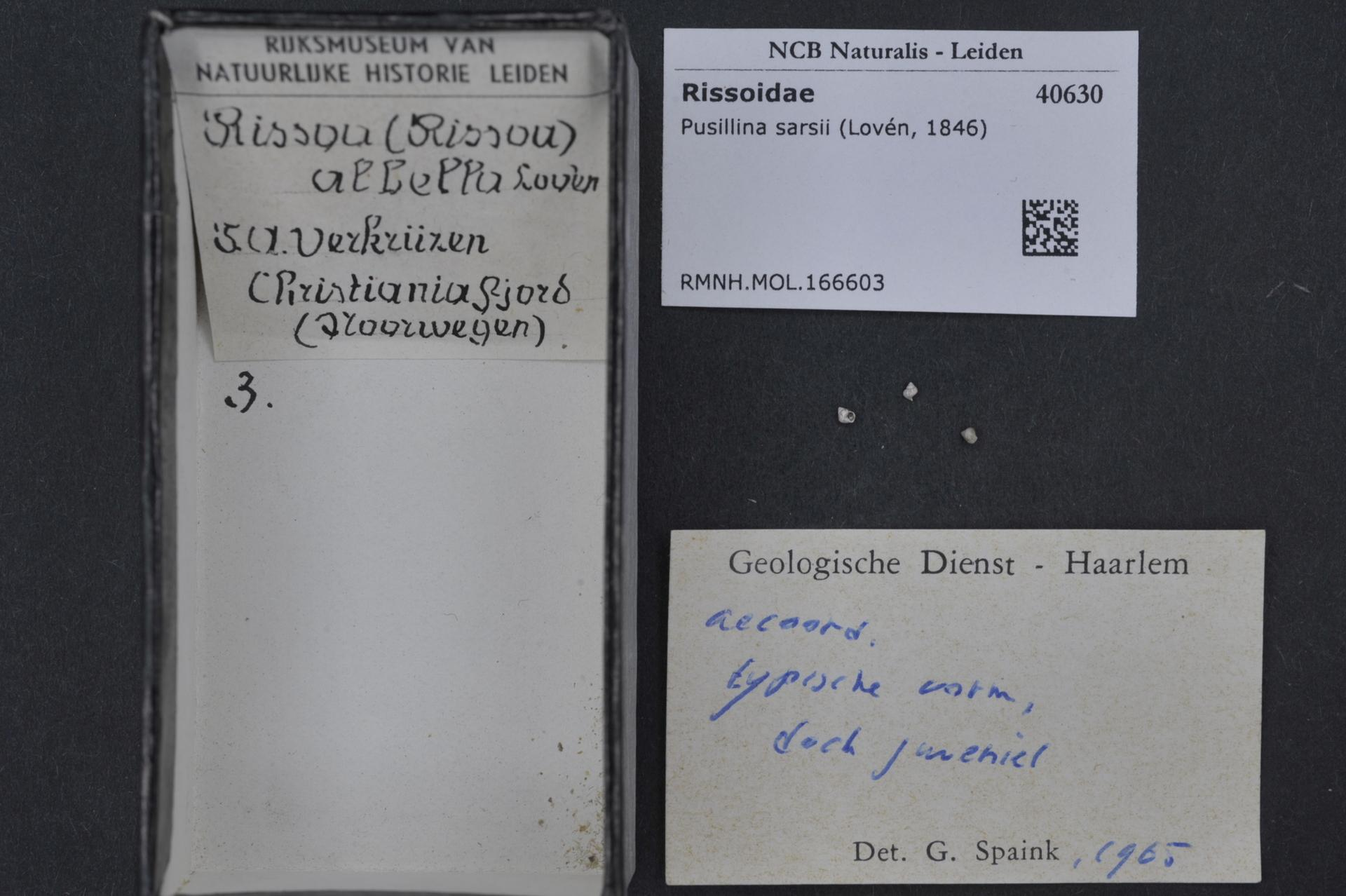

Scientific classification
- Kingdom: Animalia
- Phylum: Mollusca
- Class: Gastropoda
- Subclass: Caenogastropoda
- Order: Littorinimorpha
- Family: Rissoidae
- Genus: Pusillina
- Species: P. sarsii

Binomial name
- Pusillina sarsii (Lovén, 1846)

Synonyms
- Pusillina sarsi [sic] (misspelling); Rissoa albella Lovén, 1846; Rissoa sarsii Lovén, 1846 · unaccepted (original combination); Turboella conspicuosa [sic] (a non-existing name, probably a misspelling (and misidentification) of inconspicua (Alder, 1844))

= Pusillina sarsii =

Species of gastropod

Pusillina sarsii is a species of small sea snail, a marine gastropod mollusk or micromollusk in the family Rissoidae.
