= Cerithidium cerithinum =

Scientific classification
- Kingdom: Animalia
- Phylum: Mollusca
- Class: Gastropoda
- Subclass: Caenogastropoda
- Order: incertae sedis
- Family: Cerithiidae
- Genus: Cerithidium
- Species: C. cerithinum

Binomial name
- Cerithidium cerithinum (Philippi, 1849)

Synonyms
- Fenella cerithina (Philippi, 1849); Rissoa cerithinum Philippi, 1849 (basionym)

Species of gastropod

Cerithidium cerithinum is a species of sea snail, a marine gastropod mollusk in the family Cerithiidae.

== Distribution ==
This species is distributed in the Red Sea and in the Indian Ocean along Madagascar.
