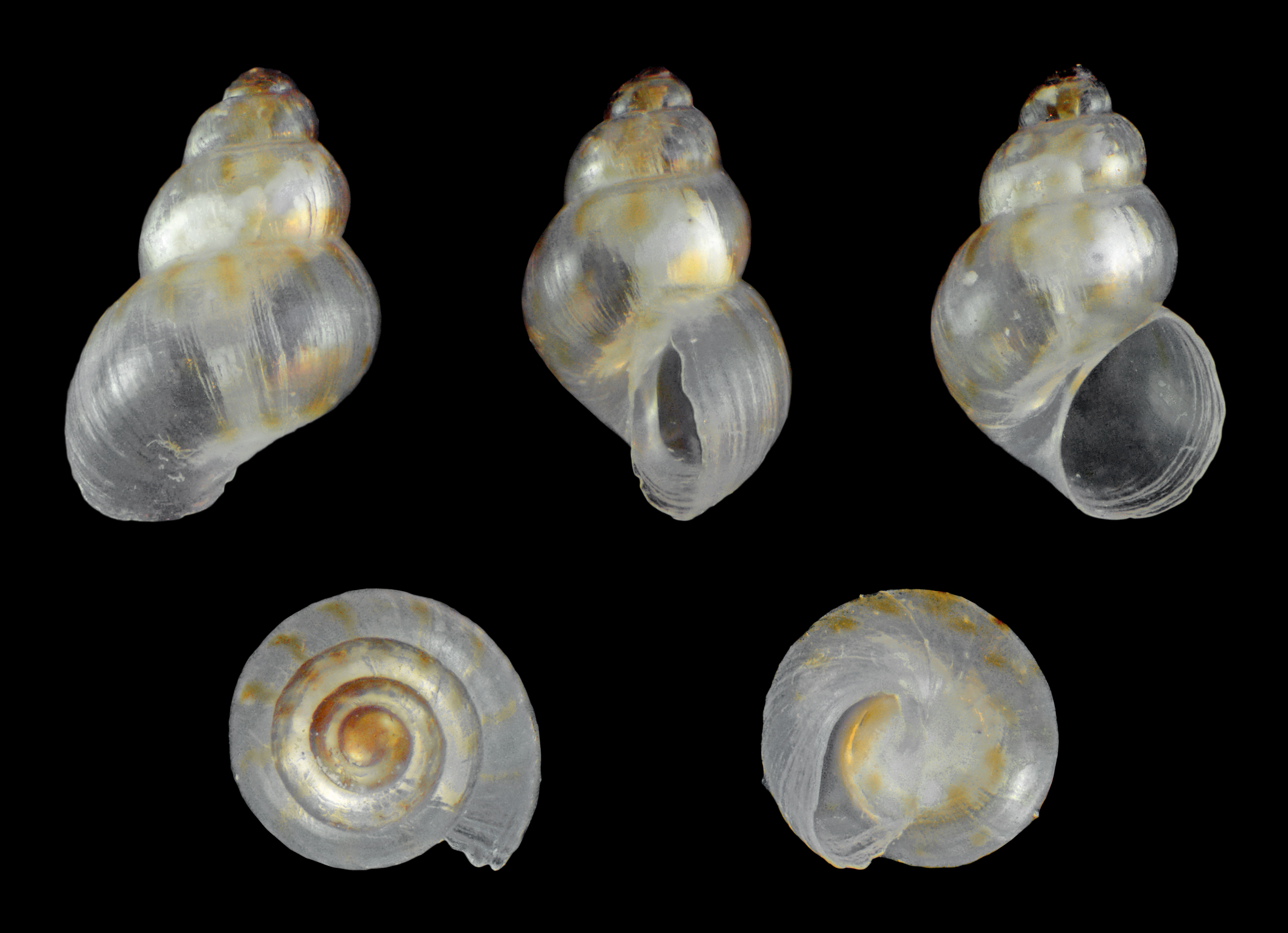
- Setia amabilis (Locard, 1886)

Scientific classification
- Kingdom: Animalia
- Phylum: Mollusca
- Class: Gastropoda
- Subclass: Caenogastropoda
- Order: Littorinimorpha
- Superfamily: Rissooidea
- Family: Rissoidae
- Genus: Setia; H. Adams & A. Adams, 1852

Synonyms
- Cingula (Setia) H. Adams & A. Adams, 1852; Parvisetia Monterosato, 1884; Putilla (Varisetia) Nordsieck, 1972; Rissoa (Setia) H. Adams & A. Adams, 1852; Rissoia (Setia) H. Adams & A. Adams, 1852; Rudolphosetia Monterosato, 1917

= Setia (gastropod) =

Genus of very small gastropods

Setia is a genus of minute sea snails, marine gastropod mollusks or micromollusks in the family Rissoidae.

== Description ==
(Original description in Latin) The tentacles are hairy. The opercular lobe is small, and no caudal cirrus (or appendage) is present. The foot is simple behind.

== Species ==
Species within the genus Setia include:

- Setia alaskana (Bartsch, 1912)
- Setia alboranensis Peñas & Rolán, 2006
- Setia amabilis (Locard, 1886)
- Setia ambigua (Brugnone, 1873)
- Setia anselmoi (van Aartsen & Engl, 1999)
- Setia antipolitana (van der Linden & Wagner, 1987)
- Setia bruggeni (Verduin, 1984)
- Setia conoidea Seguenza, 1903
- Setia fusca (Philippi, 1841)
- Setia gittenbergeri (Verduin, 1984)
- †Setia globosa Seguenza, 1879
- Setia homerica Romani & Scuderi, 2015
- Setia impolite Rolán & Hernández, 2006
- Setia incognita Perugia, 2021
- Setia jansseni (Verduin, 1984)
- Setia lacourti (Verduin, 1984)
- Setia latior (Mighels & Adams, 1842)
- Setia levantina Bogi & Galil, 2007
- Setia limpida Monterosato, 1884
- Setia miae Verduin, 1988
- Setia microbia Hoenselaar & Hoenselaar, 1991
- Setia nicoleae Segers, Swinnen & De Prins, 2009
- Setia nomeae Moolenbeek & Piersma, 1990
- † Setia occidentalis Le Renard, 1990
- Setia pulcherrima (Jeffreys, 1848)
- Setia scillae (Aradas & Benoit, 1876)
- Setia sciutiana (Aradas & Benoit, 1874)
- Setia slikorum (Verduin, 1984)
- Setia subvaricosa Gofas, 1990<
- Setia triangularis (Watson, 1886)
- Setia tricincta A. Adams, 1861
- Setia turriculata Monterosato, 1884
- Setia valvatoides (Milaschewitsch, 1909)

Species brought into synonymy

- Setia aartseni (Verduin, 1984): synonym of Crisilla aartseni (Verduin, 1984)
- Setia alexandrae Ávila & Cordeiro, 2015: synonym of Rissoella alexandrae (S. P. Ávila & Cordeiro, 2015)
- Setia atropurpurea Frauenfeld, 1867 accepted as Eatoniella atropurpurea (Frauenfeld, 1867) (original combination)
- Setia beniamina (Monterosato, 1884): synonym of Crisilla beniamina (Monterosato, 1884)
- Setia bifasciata A. Adams, 1861 accepted as Putilla bifasciata (A. Adams, 1861) (original combination)
- Setia candida A. Adams, 1861: synonym of Charisma candida (A. Adams, 1861)
- Setia depicta (Manzoni, 1868): synonym of Crisilla depicta (Manzoni, 1868)
- Setia ermelindoi Ávila & Cordeiro, 2015: synonym of Rissoella ermelindoi (S. P. Ávila & Cordeiro, 2015)
- Setia gianninii F. Nordsieck, 1974: synonym of Onoba gianninii (F. Nordsieck, 1974)
- Setia inflata Monterosato, 1884: synonym of Setia fusca (Philippi, 1841)
- Setia innominata (Verduin, 1988): synonym of Crisilla innominata (R. B. Watson, 1897)
- Setia kuiperi (Verduin, 1984): synonym of Setia limpida Monterosato, 1884
- Setia lidyae Verduin, 1988: synonym of Crisilla iunoniae (Palazzi, 1988)
- Setia macilenta Monterosato, 1880: synonym of Obtusella macilenta (Monterosato, 1880)
- Setia maculata (Monterosato, 1869): synonym of Crisilla maculata (Monterosato, 1869)
- Setia marmorata (Cantraine, 1842): synonym of Crisilla semistriata (Montagu, 1808)
- Setia netoae Ávila & Cordeiro, 2015: synonym of Rissoella netoae (S. P. Ávila & Cordeiro, 2015)
- Setia nitens Frauenfeld, 1867 accepted as Lucidestea nitens (Frauenfeld, 1867) (original combination)
- Setia ochroleuca Brusina, 1869: synonym of Eatonina ochroleuca (Brusina, 1869)
- Setia pallaryi Hornung & Mermod, 1927 accepted as Lucidestea pallaryi (Hornung & Mermod, 1927) (original combination)
- Setia perminima (Manzoni, 1868): synonym of Crisilla perminima (Manzoni, 1868)
- Setia pumila Monterosato, 1884: synonym of Eatonina pumila (Monterosato, 1884)
- Setia quisquiliarum (Watson, 1886): synonym of Crisilla quisquiliarum (R. B. Watson, 1886)
- Setia roseotincta Dautzenberg, 1889: synonym of Obtusella roseotincta (Dautzenberg, 1889)
- Setia soluta (Philippi, 1844): synonym of Setia fusca (Philippi, 1841)
- Setia subsulcata (Philippi, 1844): synonym of Crisilla semistriata (Montagu, 1808)
- Setia tenuisculpta (R.B. Watson, 1873): synonym of Talassia tenuisculpta (R. B. Watson, 1873)
- Setia tiberiana (Issel, 1869): synonym of Voorwindia tiberiana (Issel, 1869)
- Setia translucida Nordsieck, 1972: synonym of Rissoella diaphana (Alder, 1848)
- Setia tumidula G.O. Sars, 1878: synonym of Obtusella tumidula (Sars G. O., 1878)
- Setia turgida (Jeffreys, 1870): synonym of Pseudosetia turgida (Jeffreys, 1870)
- Setia ugesae Verduin, 1988: synonym of Crisilla ugesae (Verduin, 1988)
