= Alvania peloritana =

Scientific classification
- Kingdom: Animalia
- Phylum: Mollusca
- Class: Gastropoda
- Subclass: Caenogastropoda
- Order: Littorinimorpha
- Superfamily: Rissooidea
- Family: Rissoidae
- Genus: Alvania
- Species: A. peloritana

Binomial name
- Alvania peloritana (Aradas & Benoit, 1874)

Synonyms
- Rissoa peloritana Aradas & Benoit, 1874

Species of gastropod

Alvania peloritana is a species of small sea snail, a marine gastropod mollusk or micromollusk in the family Rissoidae.

== Description ==
The length of the shell attains 3.2 mm.

== Distribution ==
This species occurs in the Mediterranean Sea (off the coast of Messina)
