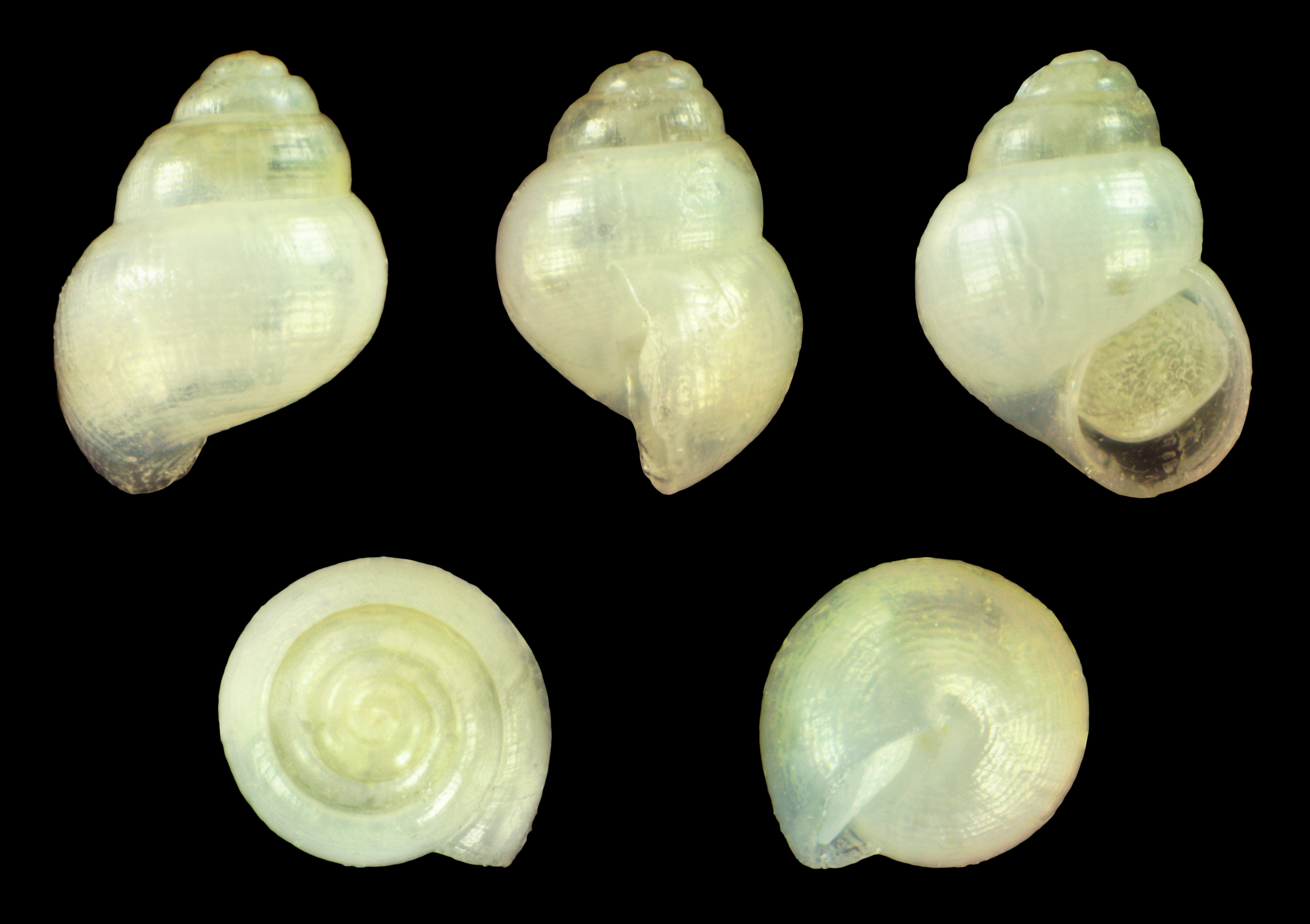
- Obtusella intersecta shell

Scientific classification
- Kingdom: Animalia
- Phylum: Mollusca
- Class: Gastropoda
- Subclass: Caenogastropoda
- Order: Littorinimorpha
- Family: Rissoidae
- Genus: Obtusella; Cossmann, 1921

Type species
- Obtusella intersecta (S.V. Wood, 1857)

= Obtusella =

Genus of gastropods

Obtusella is a genus of minute sea snails, marine gastropod mollusks or micromollusks in the family Rissoidae.

== Species ==
Seven species are currently recognised in the genus Obtusella.

- Obtusella erinacea (Linnaeus, 1758)
- Obtusella intersecta (S.V. Wood, 1857) – syn. Obtusella alderi (Jeffreys, 1858)
- Obtusella lata Rolán & Rubio, 1999
- Obtusella macilenta (Monterosato, 1880)
- Obtusella orisparvi Moreno, Peñas & Rolán, 2003
- Obtusella roseotincta (Dautzenberg, 1889)
- Obtusella tumidula (G. O. Sars, 1878)
