= Crisilla galvagni =

Scientific classification
- Kingdom: Animalia
- Phylum: Mollusca
- Class: Gastropoda
- Subclass: Caenogastropoda
- Order: Littorinimorpha
- Family: Rissoidae
- Genus: Crisilla
- Species: C. galvagni

Binomial name
- Crisilla galvagni (Aradas & Maggiore, 1844)

Synonyms
- Alvania pseudocingulata (F. Nordsieck, 1972); Crisilla pseudocingulata (Nordsieck, 1972); Rissoa galvagni Aradas & Maggiore, 1844 (original combination); Setia (Crisillosetia) pseudocingulata Nordsieck, 1972

Species of sea snail

Crisilla galvagni is a species of small sea snail, a marine gastropod mollusk or micromollusk in the family Rissoidae.

== Description ==
The shell attains a length of 1.4 mm.

== Distribution ==
This marine species occurs in the Western Mediterranean Sea.
