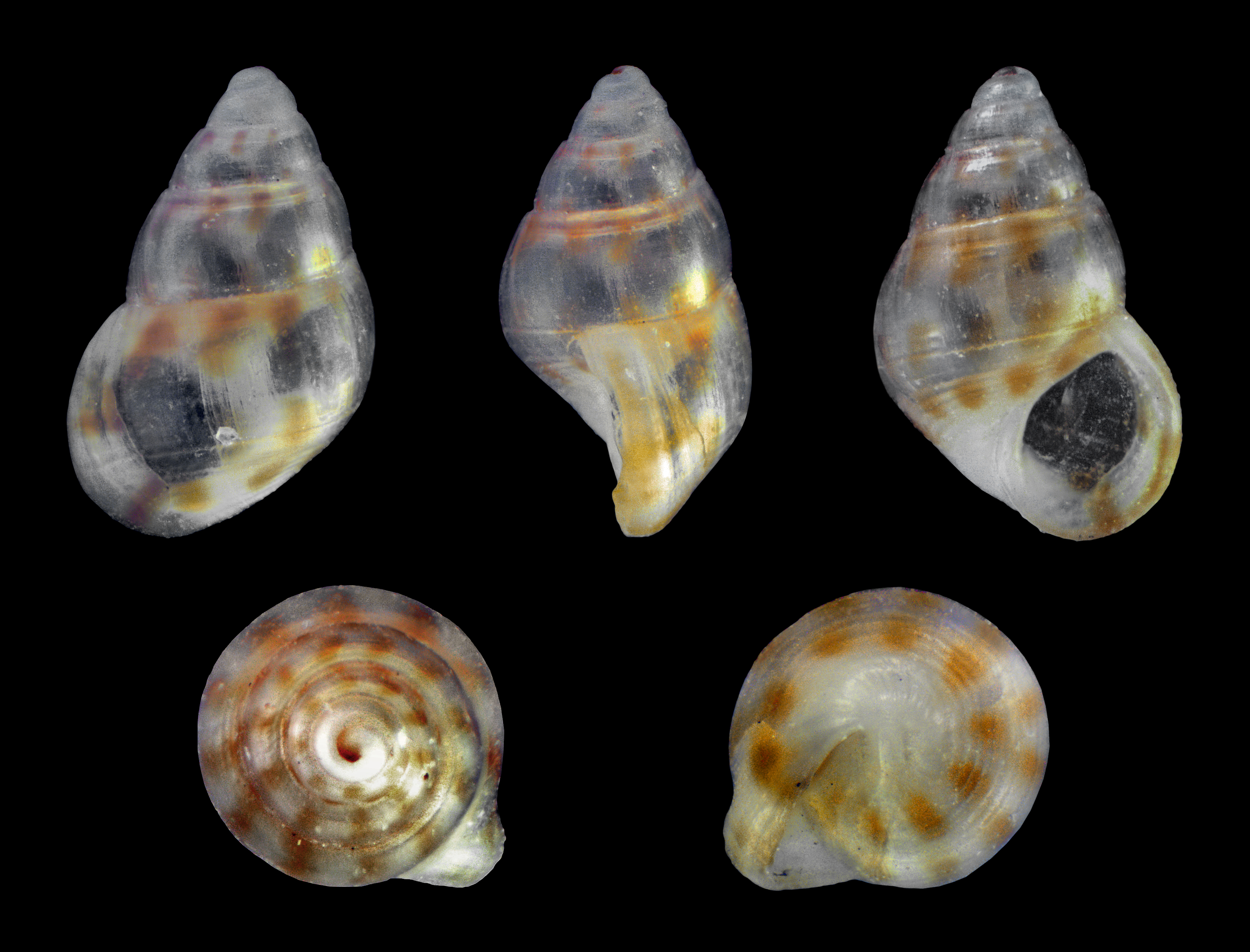
- Crisilla depicta (Manzoni, 1868)

Scientific classification
- Kingdom: Animalia
- Phylum: Mollusca
- Class: Gastropoda
- Subclass: Caenogastropoda
- Order: Littorinimorpha
- Superfamily: Rissooidea
- Family: Rissoidae
- Genus: Crisilla; Monterosato, 1917

Type species
- Crisilla semistriata (Montagu, 1808) (type by monotypy)

Species
- See text

Synonyms
- Alvania (Crisilla) Monterosato, 1917; Setia (Crisillosetia) Nordsieck, 1972

= Crisilla =

Genus of gastropods

Crisilla is a genus of minute sea snails, marine gastropod mollusks or micromollusks in the family Rissoidae.

== Species ==
Species within the genus Crisilla include:

- Crisilla aartseni (Verduin, 1984)
- Crisilla alvarezi Templado & Rolán, 1994
- Crisilla amphiglypha Bouchet & Warén, 1993
- Crisilla angustostriata Van der Linden, 2005
- † Crisilla ariejansseni Van Dingenen, Ceulemans & Landau, 2016
- Crisilla avilai Hoffman & Freiwald, 2021
- Crisilla basteriae (Moolenbeek & Faber, 1986)
- Crisilla beniamina (Monterosato, 1884)
- Crisilla callosa (Manzoni, 1868)
- Crisilla chiarellii (Cecalupo & Quadri, 1995)
- Crisilla cristallinula (Manzoni, 1868)
- Crisilla depicta (Manzoni, 1868)
- Crisilla didyme Amati & Oliverio, 2020
- Crisilla difficilis J. D. Oliver, Rolán & Templado, 2019
- Crisilla fallax Gofas, 1999
- Crisilla gagliniae (Amati, 1985)
- Crisilla galvagni (Aradas & Maggiore, 1844)
- Crisilla graxai Templado & Rolán, 1994
- Crisilla herosae Hoffman & Freiwald, 2021
- Crisilla hiera Amati, Di Giulio & Oliverio, 2021
- Crisilla indispecta J. D. Oliver, Rolán & Templado, 2019
- Crisilla innominata (Watson, 1897)
- Crisilla iunoniae (Palazzi, 1988)
- Crisilla javieri J. D. Oliver, Rolán & Templado, 2019
- Crisilla juliencillisi Swinnen & Nappo, 2023
- Crisilla luquei Templado & Rolán, 1994
- Crisilla maculata (Monterosato, 1869)
- Crisilla marioni Fasulo & Gaglini, 1987
- Crisilla monicae J. D. Oliver, Rolán & Templado, 2019
- Crisilla morenoi Templado & Rolán, 1994
- Crisilla orteai Templado & Rolán, 1994
- Crisilla ovulum Gofas, 2007
- Crisilla perminima (Manzoni, 1868)
- Crisilla picta (Jeffreys, 1867)
- Crisilla postrema (Gofas, 1990)
- Crisilla quisquiliarum (R. B. Watson, 1886)
- Crisilla ramosorum Oliver, Templado & Kersting, 2012
- Crisilla sabiha Mifsud, 2023
- Crisilla semistriata (Montagu, 1808)
- Crisilla senegalensis Rolán & Hernández, 2006
- Crisilla simulans (Locard, 1886)
- Crisilla spadix (Watson, 1897)
- Crisilla transitoria Gofas, 1999
- Crisilla ugesae (Verduin, 1988)
- Crisilla vidali Templado & Rolán, 1994
- Crisilla yvessamyni Swinnen & Nappo, 2023

Species brought into synonymy

- Crisilla lincta (Watson, 1873): synonym of Onoba lincta (Watson, 1873)
- Crisilla pseudocingulata (Nordsieck, 1972): synonym of Crisilla galvagni (Aradas & Maggiore, 1844)
- Crisilla tenera (Philippi, 1844): synonym of Alvania tenera (Philippi, 1844)
