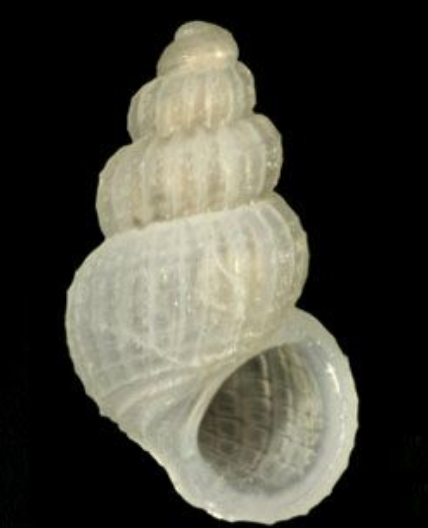
- Shell of Alvania subsoluta (specimen at the Natural History Museum, Rotterdam)

Scientific classification
- Kingdom: Animalia
- Phylum: Mollusca
- Class: Gastropoda
- Subclass: Caenogastropoda
- Order: Littorinimorpha
- Superfamily: Rissooidea
- Family: Rissoidae
- Genus: Alvania
- Species: A. subsoluta

Binomial name
- Alvania subsoluta (Aradas, 1847)

Synonyms
- Alvania (Actonia) subsoluta (Aradas,1847) .; Rissoa elegantissima G. Seguenza, 1876 junior subjective synonym; Rissoa subsoluta Aradas, 1847

= Alvania subsoluta =

Species of gastropod

Alvania subsoluta is a species of small sea snail, a marine gastropod mollusk or micromollusk in the family Rissoidae.

== Description ==
The length of the shell varies between 2 mm and 4 mm.

The thin shell is somewhat solid, white or brownishand opaline. It is rather numerously longitudinally costulate with riblets vanishing on lower part of body whorl. It shows less prominent, close, spiral striae that are stronger at the base. The shell contains five convex whorls, with a deep suture. The aperture is expanded below and externally varicose.

== Distribution ==
This marine species occurs in the Atlantic Ocean off Iceland to Norway, the Canary Islands and West Africa; in the Mediterranean Sea off Sicily and Greece.

Fossils have been found in Pleistocene strata near Messina, Sicily.
