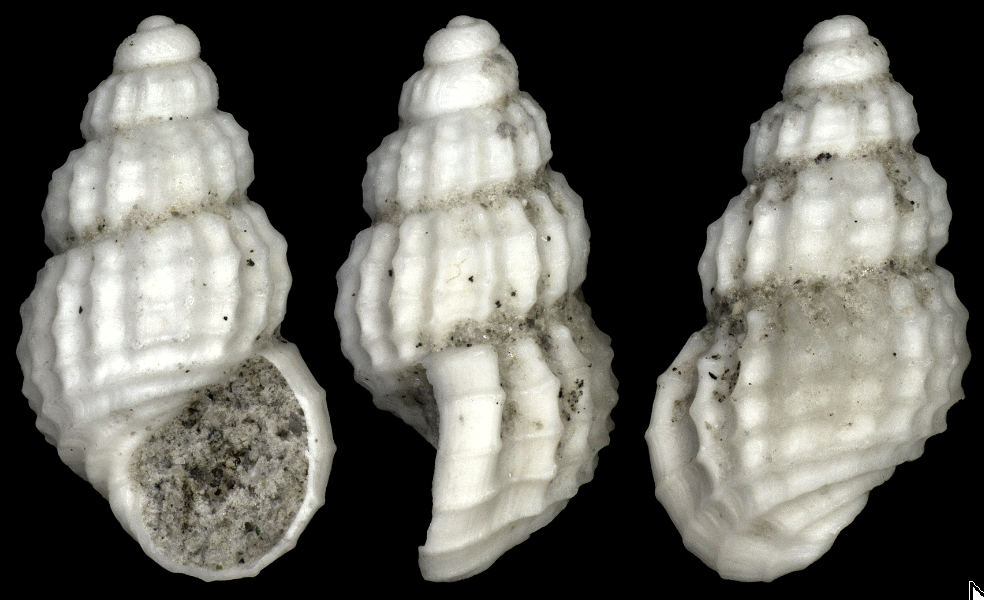
- Shell of Alvania testae (specimen at MNHN, Paris)

Scientific classification
- Kingdom: Animalia
- Phylum: Mollusca
- Class: Gastropoda
- Subclass: Caenogastropoda
- Order: Littorinimorpha
- Family: Rissoidae
- Genus: Alvania
- Species: A. testae

Binomial name
- Alvania testae (Aradas & Maggiore, 1844)

Synonyms
- Alvania abyssicola (Forbes, 1850) (junior synonym ); Alvania (Actonia) testae (Aradas & Maggiore, 1844); Rissoa abyssicola Forbes, 1850 (dubious synonym); Rissoa abyssicola var. conformis Jeffreys, 1870; Rissoa testae Aradas & Maggiore, 1844 (original combination)

= Alvania testae =

Species of gastropod

Alvania testae is a species of small sea snail, a marine gastropod mollusc or micromollusk in the family Rissoidae.

== Description ==
The length of the shell varies between 2 mm and 4 mm.

The whitish shell is somewhat solid and transparent. It showsh distant thin plicae, vanishing towards the base, subcancellated by less elevated, distant, spiral lirae. The shell contains six whorls, somewhat convex, with a deep suture. The aperture is effuse below. The outer lip is acute, smooth within and externally varicose.

== Distribution ==
This species occurs in the Atlantic Ocean from Norway to West Africa; in the Mediterranean Sea (Corsica, Italy, Greece).

Fossils have been found in Pleistocene strata near Ficarazzi, Sicily.
