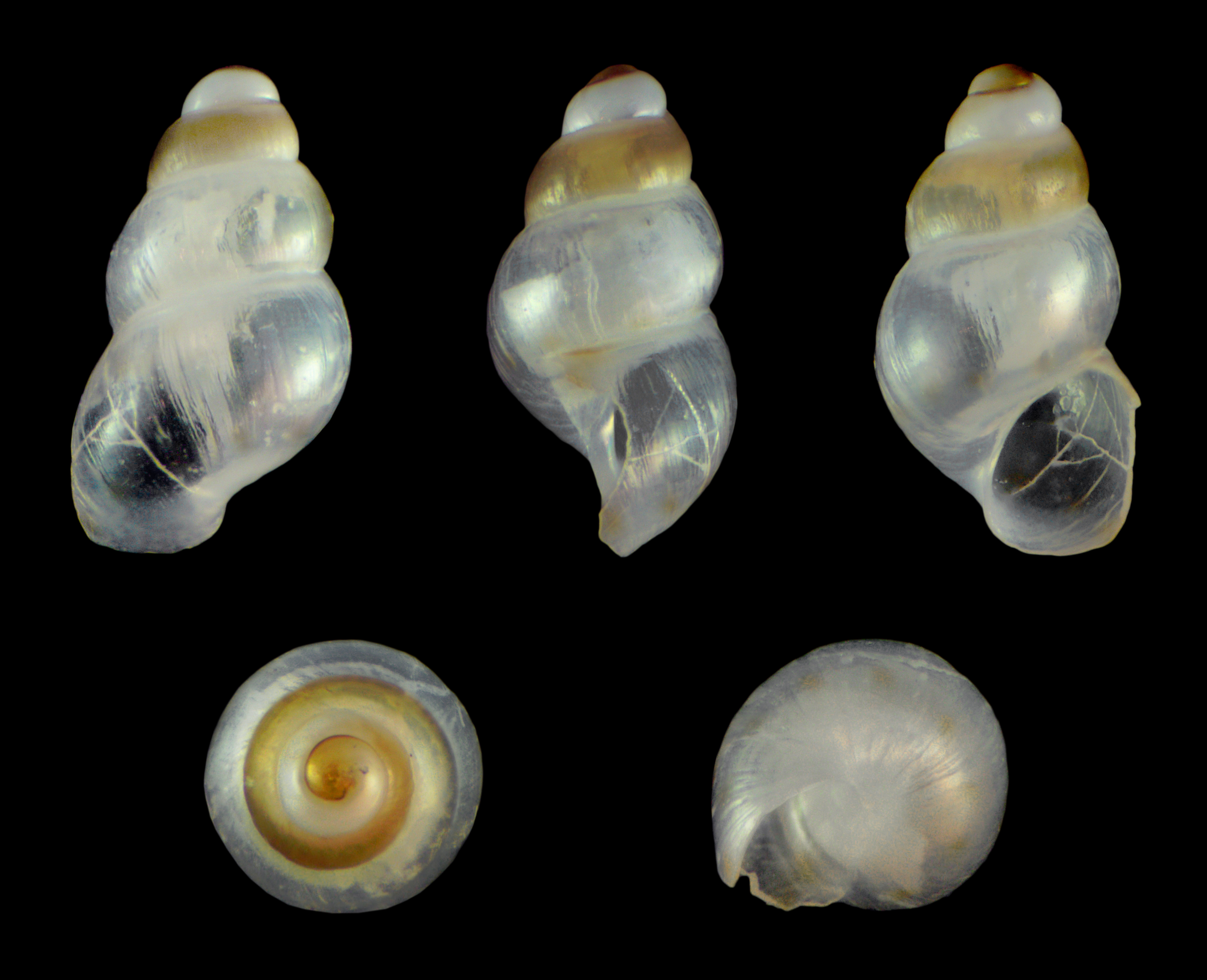
- Several views of a shell of Setia scillae

Scientific classification
- Kingdom: Animalia
- Phylum: Mollusca
- Class: Gastropoda
- Subclass: Caenogastropoda
- Order: Littorinimorpha
- Family: Rissoidae
- Genus: Setia
- Species: S. scillae

Binomial name
- Setia scillae (Aradas & Benoit, 1876)

Synonyms
- Rissoa scillae Aradas & Benoit, 1876 (original combination)

= Setia scillae =

Species of gastropod

Setia scillae is a species of minute sea snail, a marine gastropod mollusk or micromollusk in the family Rissoidae.
