= Crisilla ramosorum =

Scientific classification
- Kingdom: Animalia
- Phylum: Mollusca
- Class: Gastropoda
- Subclass: Caenogastropoda
- Order: Littorinimorpha
- Family: Rissoidae
- Genus: Crisilla
- Species: C. ramosorum

Binomial name
- Crisilla ramosorum Oliver, Templado & Kersting, 2012

Species of sea snail

Crisilla ramosorum is a species of small sea snail, a marine gastropod mollusk or micromollusk in the family Rissoidae.
