= Setia fusca =

Scientific classification
- Kingdom: Animalia
- Phylum: Mollusca
- Class: Gastropoda
- Subclass: Caenogastropoda
- Order: Littorinimorpha
- Family: Rissoidae
- Genus: Setia
- Species: S. fusca

Binomial name
- Setia fusca (Philippi, 1841)

Synonyms
- Rissoa soluta Philippi, 1844 (dubious synonym); Rudolphosetia fusca (Philippi, 1844); Setia inflata Monterosato, 1884; Setia soluta (Philippi, 1844); Truncatella fusca Philippi, 1841

Species of gastropod

Setia fusca is a species of small sea snail, a marine gastropod mollusk or micromollusk in the family Rissoidae.
