= Pseudosetia semipellucida =

Scientific classification
- Kingdom: Animalia
- Phylum: Mollusca
- Class: Gastropoda
- Subclass: Caenogastropoda
- Order: Littorinimorpha
- Family: Rissoidae
- Genus: Pseudosetia
- Species: P. semipellucida

Binomial name
- Pseudosetia semipellucida (Friele, 1879)

Species of gastropod

Pseudosetia semipellucida is a species of minute sea snail, a marine gastropod mollusk or micromollusk in the family Rissoidae.
