= Obtusella lata =

Scientific classification
- Kingdom: Animalia
- Phylum: Mollusca
- Class: Gastropoda
- Subclass: Caenogastropoda
- Order: Littorinimorpha
- Family: Rissoidae
- Genus: Obtusella
- Species: O. lata

Binomial name
- Obtusella lata Rolán & Rubio, 1999

Species of gastropod

Obtusella lata is a species of minute sea snail, a marine gastropod mollusk or micromollusk in the family Rissoidae.
