= Crisilla simulans =

Scientific classification
- Kingdom: Animalia
- Phylum: Mollusca
- Class: Gastropoda
- Subclass: Caenogastropoda
- Order: Littorinimorpha
- Family: Rissoidae
- Genus: Crisilla
- Species: C. simulans

Binomial name
- Crisilla simulans Locard, 1886

Synonyms
- Alvania simulans Locard, 1886 (original combination)

Species of gastropod

Crisilla simulans is a species of minute sea snail, a marine gastropod mollusk or micromollusk in the family Rissoidae.

== Description ==
Alvania simulans has a small (1.5-2mm) shell that is pearly white in color, and partially translucent.

== Distribution ==
Crisilla simulans is found in the North Atlantic and European waters.
