= Setia miae =

Scientific classification
- Kingdom: Animalia
- Phylum: Mollusca
- Class: Gastropoda
- Subclass: Caenogastropoda
- Order: Littorinimorpha
- Family: Rissoidae
- Genus: Setia
- Species: S. miae

Binomial name
- Setia miae Verduin, 1988

Species of gastropod

Setia miae is a species of small sea snail, a marine gastropod mollusk or micromollusk in the family Rissoidae.
