= Pseudosetia ficaratiensis =

Scientific classification
- Kingdom: Animalia
- Phylum: Mollusca
- Class: Gastropoda
- Subclass: Caenogastropoda
- Order: Littorinimorpha
- Family: Rissoidae
- Genus: Pseudosetia
- Species: P. ficaratiensis

Binomial name
- Pseudosetia ficaratiensis (Brugnone, 1876)

Species of gastropod

Pseudosetia ficaratiensis is a species of minute sea snail, a marine gastropod mollusk or micromollusk in the family Rissoidae.
