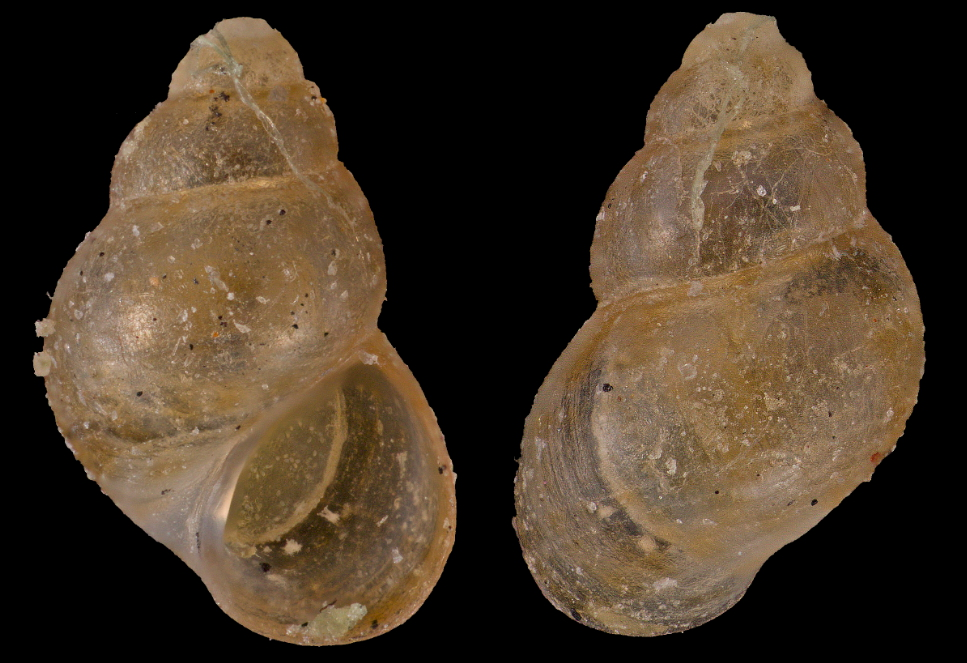
- Shell of Crisilla postrema (holotype at MNHN, Paris)

Scientific classification
- Kingdom: Animalia
- Phylum: Mollusca
- Class: Gastropoda
- Subclass: Caenogastropoda
- Order: Littorinimorpha
- Family: Rissoidae
- Genus: Crisilla
- Species: C. postrema

Binomial name
- Crisilla postrema (Gofas, 1990)

Synonyms
- Alvania (Crisilla) postrema Gofas, 1990

= Crisilla postrema =

Species of minute sea snail

Crisilla postrema is a species of minute sea snail, a marine gastropod mollusk or micromollusk in the family Rissoidae.

== Distribution ==
This species occurs in the Atlantic Ocean off the Azores.
