= Setia bruggeni =

Scientific classification
- Kingdom: Animalia
- Phylum: Mollusca
- Class: Gastropoda
- Subclass: Caenogastropoda
- Order: Littorinimorpha
- Family: Rissoidae
- Genus: Setia
- Species: S. bruggeni

Binomial name
- Setia bruggeni (Verduin, 1984)

Synonyms
- Cingula bruggeni Verduin, 1984

Species of gastropod

Setia bruggeni is a species of small sea snail, a marine gastropod mollusk or micromollusk in the family Rissoidae. It has fresh shells are transparent, whitish or of a light horny colour. The top whorls usually are of the same transparency and colour as the lower ones, less frequently they are somewhat darker and brownish. Ornamental sculpture absent on the lower whorls. The shells are not very solid. There is no labial rib, nor does the aperture show any other peculiarities. […] There is a wide and deep umbilicus. In some shells the end of the body whorl may even be detached from the previous one. […] At a magnification of 40X, about 15 fine and close-set spiral striae may be seen on the protoconch of some specimens.
