= Pseudosetia amydralox =

Scientific classification
- Kingdom: Animalia
- Phylum: Mollusca
- Class: Gastropoda
- Subclass: Caenogastropoda
- Order: Littorinimorpha
- Family: Rissoidae
- Genus: Pseudosetia
- Species: P. amydralox

Binomial name
- Pseudosetia amydralox Bouchet & Warén, 1993

Species of gastropod

Pseudosetia amydralox is a species of minute sea snail, a marine gastropod mollusk or micromollusk in the family Rissoidae.
