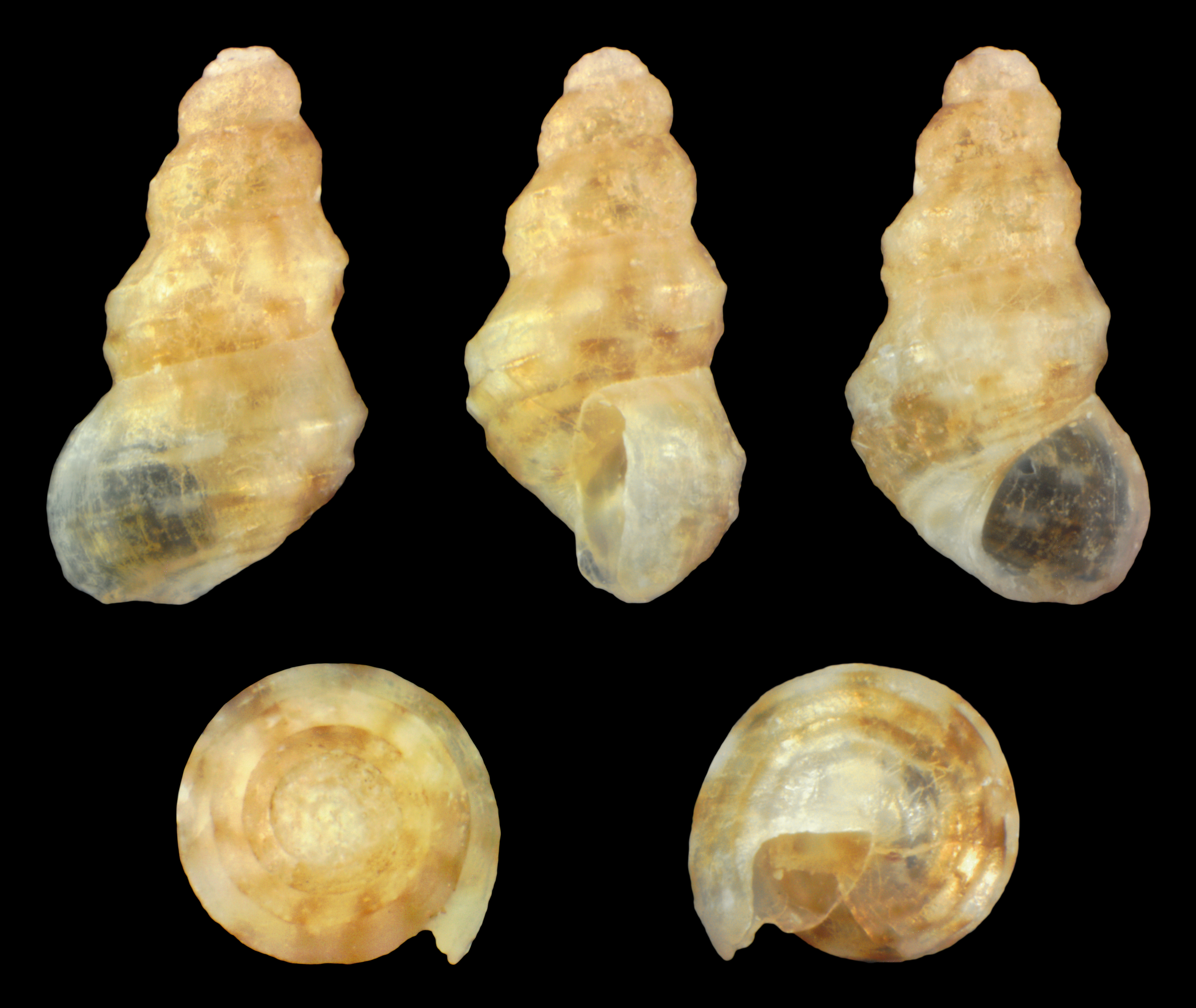

Scientific classification
- Kingdom: Animalia
- Phylum: Mollusca
- Class: Gastropoda
- Subclass: Caenogastropoda
- Order: Littorinimorpha
- Family: Rissoidae
- Genus: Crisilla
- Species: C. basteriae

Binomial name
- Crisilla basteriae (Moolenbeek & Faber, 1986)

Synonyms
- Alvania basteriae (Moolenbeek & Faber, 1986); Cingula basteriae Moolenbeek & Faber, 1987

= Crisilla basteriae =

Species of gastropod

Crisilla basteriae is a species of small sea snail, a marine gastropod mollusk or micromollusk in the family Rissoidae.

== Description ==
The shell grows to a length of 1.4 mm.

== Distribution ==
This species occurs in European waters along the Canary Islands.
