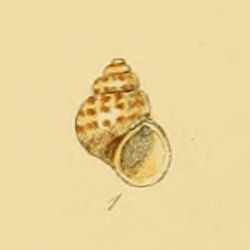

Scientific classification
- Kingdom: Animalia
- Phylum: Mollusca
- Class: Gastropoda
- Subclass: Caenogastropoda
- Order: Littorinimorpha
- Family: Rissoidae
- Genus: Setia
- Species: S. pulcherrima

Binomial name
- Setia pulcherrima (Jeffreys, 1848)

Synonyms
- Rissoa pulcherrima Jeffreys, 1848

= Setia pulcherrima =

Species of gastropod

Setia pulcherrima is a species of minute sea snail, a marine gastropod mollusk or micromollusk in the family Rissoidae.
