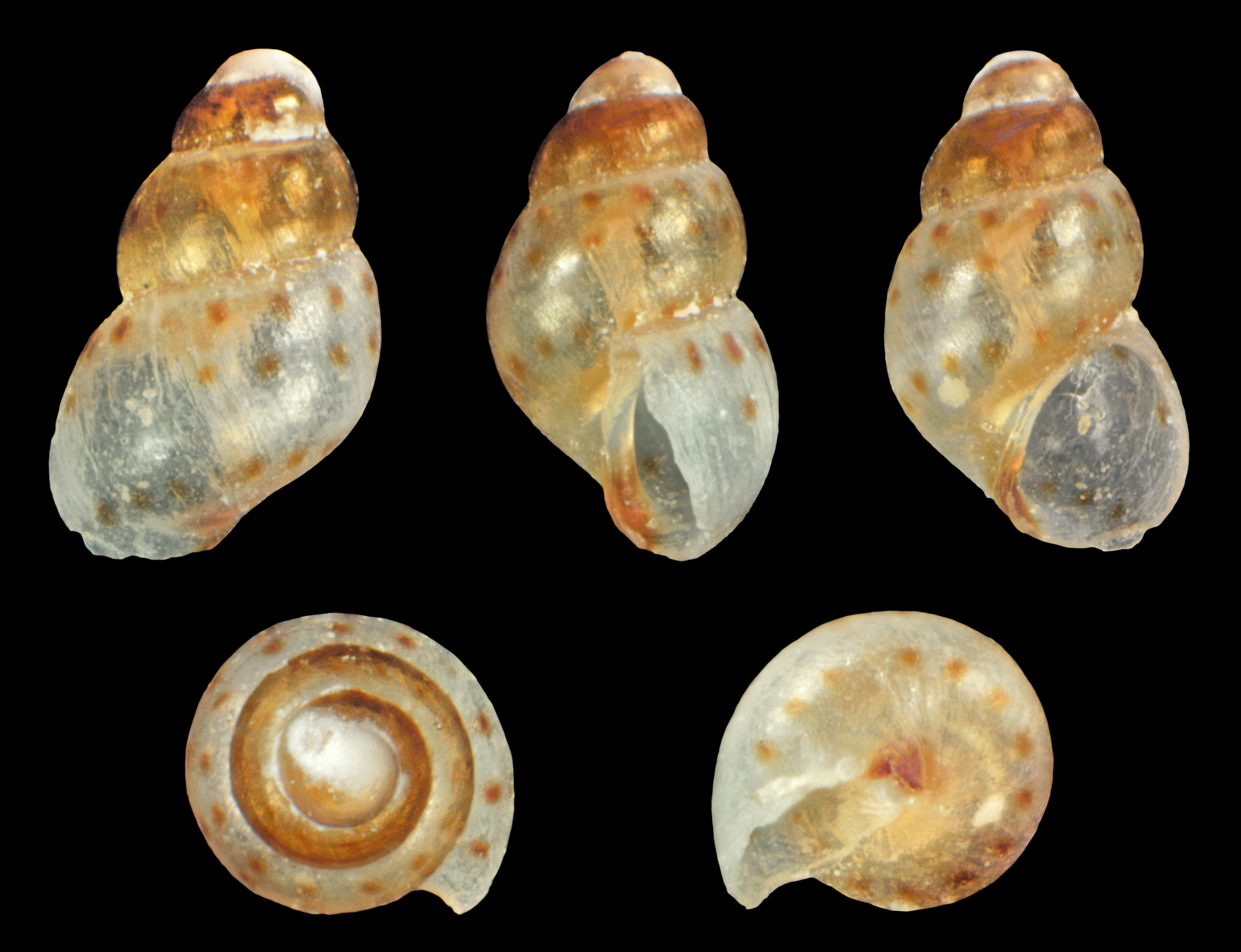

Scientific classification
- Kingdom: Animalia
- Phylum: Mollusca
- Class: Gastropoda
- Subclass: Caenogastropoda
- Order: Littorinimorpha
- Family: Rissoidae
- Genus: Setia
- Species: S. jansseni

Binomial name
- Setia jansseni (Verduin, 1984)

Synonyms
- Cingula jansseni Verduin, 1984

= Setia jansseni =

Species of gastropod

Setia jansseni is a species of small sea snail, a marine gastropod mollusk or micromollusk in the family Rissoidae.
