= Setia levantina =

Scientific classification
- Kingdom: Animalia
- Phylum: Mollusca
- Class: Gastropoda
- Subclass: Caenogastropoda
- Order: Littorinimorpha
- Family: Rissoidae
- Genus: Setia
- Species: S. levantina

Binomial name
- Setia levantina Bogi & Galil, 2007

Species of gastropod

Setia levantina is a species of small sea snail, a marine gastropod mollusk or micromollusk in the family Rissoidae.
