= Voorwindia =

Scientific classification
- Kingdom: Animalia
- Phylum: Mollusca
- Class: Gastropoda
- Subclass: Caenogastropoda
- Order: Littorinimorpha
- Family: Rissoidae
- Genus: Voorwindia; Ponder, 1985

Genus of gastropods

Voorwindia is a genus of minute sea snails, marine gastropod mollusks or micromollusks in the family Rissoidae.

== Species ==
Species within the genus Voorwindia include:

- Voorwindia tiberiana (Issel, 1869)
- Voorwindia umbilicata Ponder, 1985
