= Setia impolite =

Scientific classification
- Kingdom: Animalia
- Phylum: Mollusca
- Class: Gastropoda
- Subclass: Caenogastropoda
- Order: Littorinimorpha
- Family: Rissoidae
- Genus: Setia
- Species: S. impolite

Binomial name
- Setia impolite Rolán & Hernández, 2006

Species of gastropod

Setia impolite is a species of small sea snail, a marine gastropod mollusk or micromollusk in the family Rissoidae.
