= Pseudosetia =

Scientific classification
- Kingdom: Animalia
- Phylum: Mollusca
- Class: Gastropoda
- Subclass: Caenogastropoda
- Order: Littorinimorpha
- Family: Rissoidae
- Genus: Pseudosetia; Monterosato, 1884

Genus of gastropods

Pseudosetia is a genus of minute sea snails, marine gastropod mollusks or micromollusks in the family Rissoidae.

== Species ==
Species within the genus Pseudosetia include:

- Pseudosetia amydralox Bouchet & Warén, 1993
- Pseudosetia azorica Bouchet & Warén, 1993
- Pseudosetia ficaratiensis (Brugnone, 1876)
- Pseudosetia semipellucida (Friele, 1879)
- Pseudosetia turgida (Jeffreys, 1870)
