= Crisilla luquei =

Scientific classification
- Kingdom: Animalia
- Phylum: Mollusca
- Class: Gastropoda
- Subclass: Caenogastropoda
- Order: Littorinimorpha
- Family: Rissoidae
- Genus: Crisilla
- Species: C. luquei

Binomial name
- Crisilla luquei Templado & Rolán, 1994

Species of gastropod

Crisilla luquei is a species of small sea snail, a marine gastropod mollusk or micromollusk in the family Rissoidae.
