= Setia subvaricosa =

Scientific classification
- Kingdom: Animalia
- Phylum: Mollusca
- Class: Gastropoda
- Subclass: Caenogastropoda
- Order: Littorinimorpha
- Family: Rissoidae
- Genus: Setia
- Species: S. subvaricosa

Binomial name
- Setia subvaricosa Gofas, 1990

Synonyms
- Putilla messanensis f. elongata Nordsieck, 1972 (infrasubspecific name, not available)

Species of gastropod

Setia subvaricosa is a species of small sea snail, a marine gastropod mollusk or micromollusk in the family Rissoidae.
