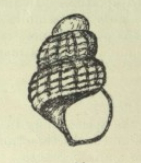
- Shell of Alvania minuta (holotype)

Scientific classification
- Kingdom: Animalia
- Phylum: Mollusca
- Class: Gastropoda
- Subclass: Caenogastropoda
- Order: Littorinimorpha
- Superfamily: Rissooidea
- Family: Rissoidae
- Genus: Alvania
- Species: †A. minuta

Binomial name
- †Alvania minuta (H. J. Finlay, 1924)

Synonyms
- † Alvania (Linemera) minuta (H. J. Finlay, 1924) alternate representation; † Linemera minuta Finlay, 1924

= Alvania minuta =

Species of gastropod

Alvania minuta is an extinct species of minute sea snail, a marine gastropod mollusc or micromollusk in the family Rissoidae.

== Taxonomy ==
Alvania minuta (Golikov & Fedjakov, 1987) is a homonym and has become a synonym of Pusillina tumidula (G. O. Sars, 1878).

== Description ==
The length of the shell attains 1.5 mm, its diameter 0.9 mm.

(Original description) The minute shell is oval, clathrate and imperforate.

The protoconch consists of 2 globose glossy whorls. The nucleus is minute, rapidly enlarging.

The teleoconch contains about 2 whorls, indistinctly shouldered just below the suture, then flatly convex. The body whorl is bluntly angled, its base almost flat.

The axial sculpture commences first, consisting of strong bluntly-rounded ribs, sloping forwards and reaching from suture to suture, the interstices narrower; they number about 19, and cease just below line of suture on the body whorl. The axials are crossed by much weaker spirals, indistinct on early whorls, 4 on penultimate whorl, broad and flatly rounded (interstices sublinear) and cutting up axials into blunt laterally-elongate tubercles. A fifth spiral emerges from the suture-line on to base and is slightly crenulated by ends of axials. Below this are 2 smooth and much fainter ribs, the rest of base smooth.

The spire is a little higher than the aperture. The suture is much impressed. The aperture is slightly oblique, sub-ovate, angled above, effuse below. The peristome is discontinuous. The outer lip is thin, but does not appear to be finished. The arcuate columella is slightly oblique.

== Distribution ==
Fossils of this marine species were found in Tertiary strata in New Zealand
