= Setia slikorum =

Scientific classification
- Kingdom: Animalia
- Phylum: Mollusca
- Class: Gastropoda
- Subclass: Caenogastropoda
- Order: Littorinimorpha
- Family: Rissoidae
- Genus: Setia
- Species: S. slikorum

Binomial name
- Setia slikorum (Verduin, 1984)

Synonyms
- Cingula sliki Verduin, 1984; Cingula slikorum Verduin, 1984

Species of gastropod

Setia slikorum is a species of small sea snail, a marine gastropod mollusk or micromollusk in the family Rissoidae.
