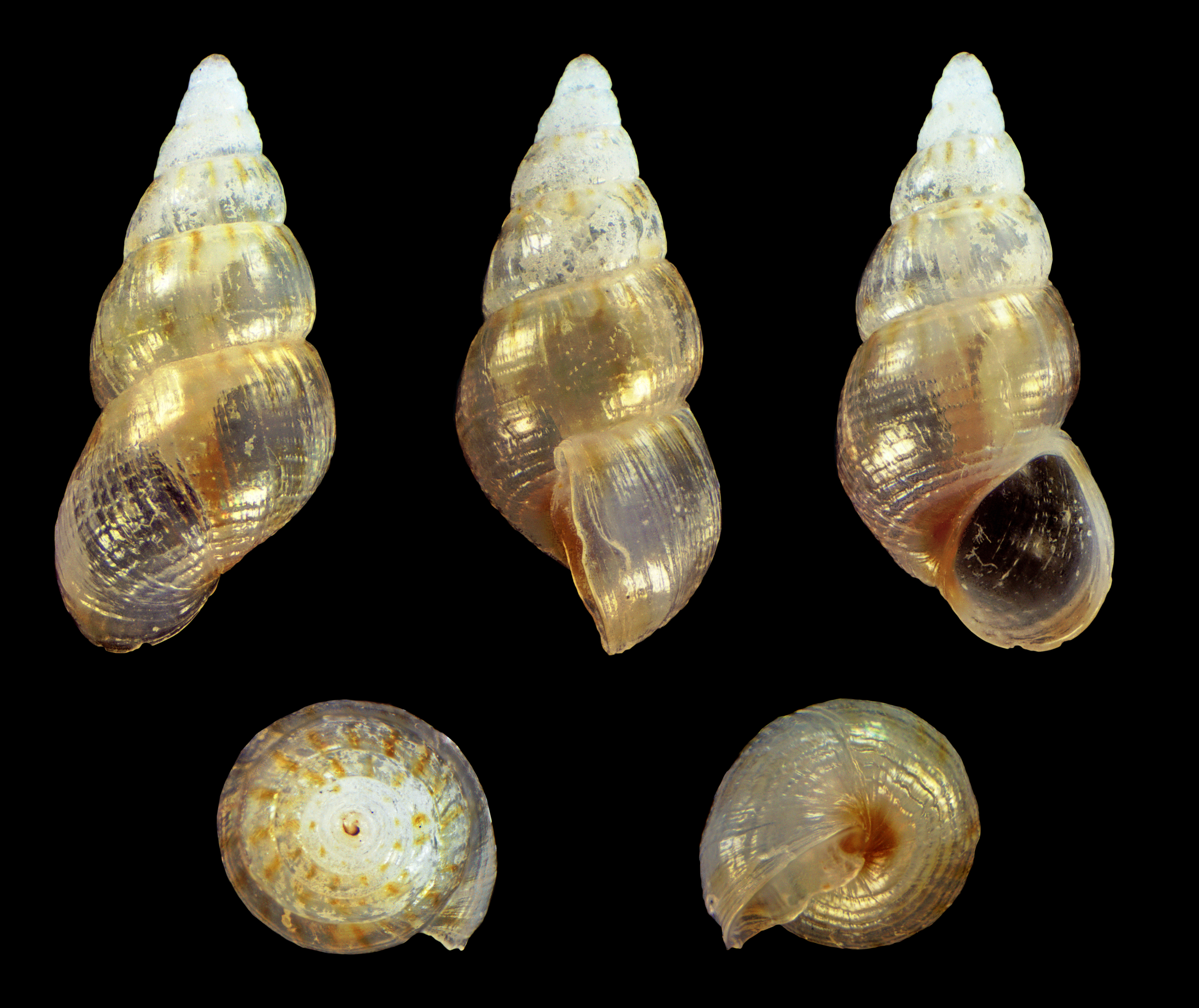

Scientific classification
- Kingdom: Animalia
- Phylum: Mollusca
- Class: Gastropoda
- Subclass: Caenogastropoda
- Order: Littorinimorpha
- Family: Rissoidae
- Genus: Setia
- Species: S. antipolitana

Binomial name
- Setia antipolitana (van der Linden & Wagner, 1987)

Synonyms
- Cingula antipolitana van der Linden & W. M. Wagner, 1987 (original combination)

= Setia antipolitana =

Species of gastropod

Setia antipolitana is a species of small sea snail, a marine gastropod mollusk or micromollusk in the family Rissoidae.
