= Setia turriculata =

Scientific classification
- Kingdom: Animalia
- Phylum: Mollusca
- Class: Gastropoda
- Subclass: Caenogastropoda
- Order: Littorinimorpha
- Family: Rissoidae
- Genus: Setia
- Species: S. turriculata

Binomial name
- Setia turriculata Monterosato, 1884

Synonyms
- Rudolphosetia turriculata (Monterosato, 1884)<

Species of gastropod

Setia turriculata is a species of minute sea snail, a marine gastropod mollusk or micromollusk in the family Rissoidae.
