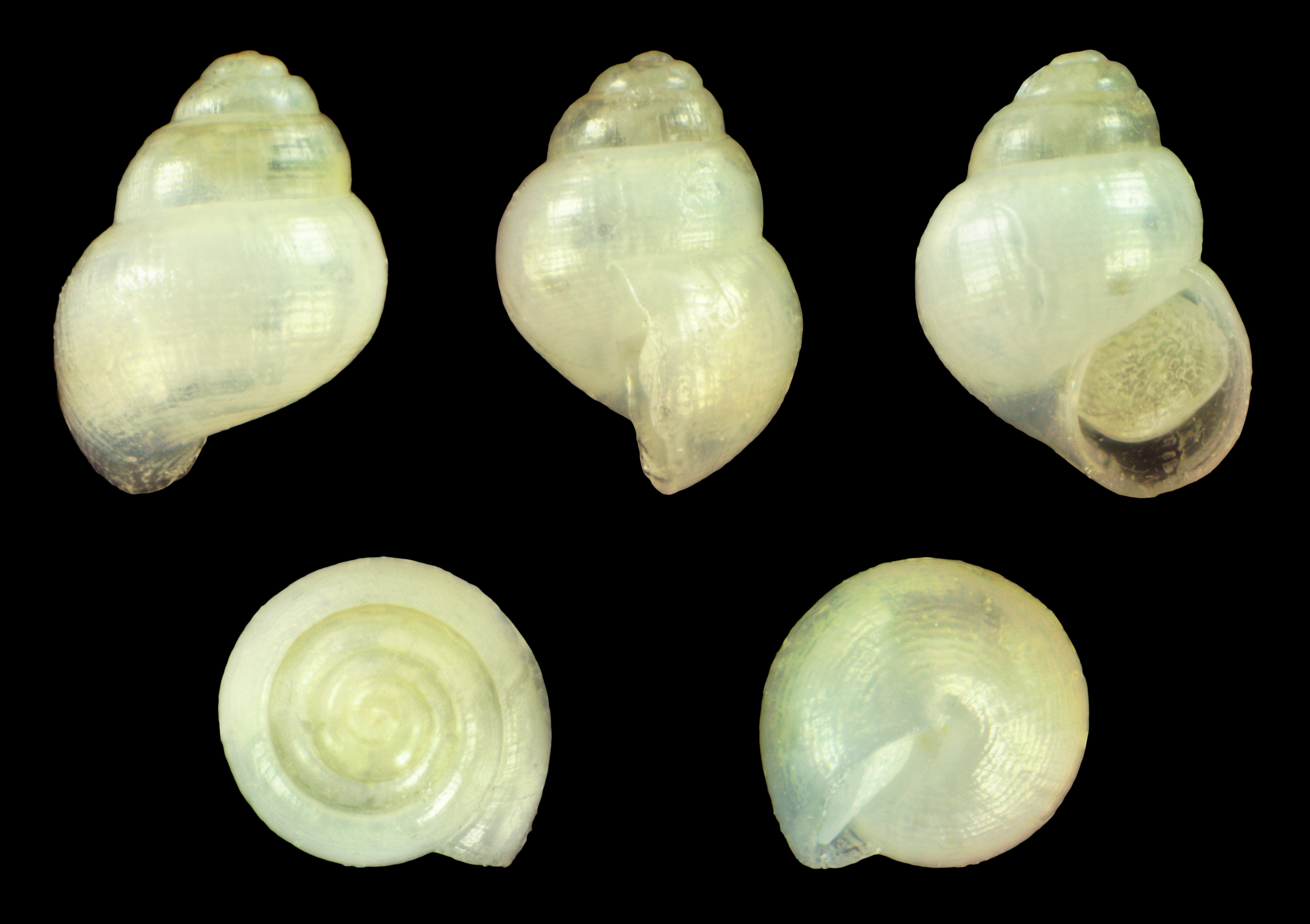
- Obtusella intersecta shell

Scientific classification
- Kingdom: Animalia
- Phylum: Mollusca
- Class: Gastropoda
- Subclass: Caenogastropoda
- Order: Littorinimorpha
- Family: Rissoidae
- Genus: Obtusella
- Species: O. intersecta

Binomial name
- Obtusella intersecta (S.V. Wood, 1857)

Synonyms
- Cingula alderi (Jeffreys, 1858)<

= Obtusella intersecta =

Species of gastropod

Obtusella intersecta is a species of small sea snail, a marine gastropod mollusk or micromollusk in the family Rissoidae.
