= Setia anselmoi =

Scientific classification
- Kingdom: Animalia
- Phylum: Mollusca
- Class: Gastropoda
- Subclass: Caenogastropoda
- Order: Littorinimorpha
- Family: Rissoidae
- Genus: Setia
- Species: S. anselmoi

Binomial name
- Setia anselmoi (van Aartsen & Engl, 1999)

Synonyms
- Cingula anselmoi van Aartsen & Engl, 1999

Species of gastropod

Setia anselmoi is a species of small sea snail, a marine gastropod mollusk or micromollusk in the family Rissoidae.
