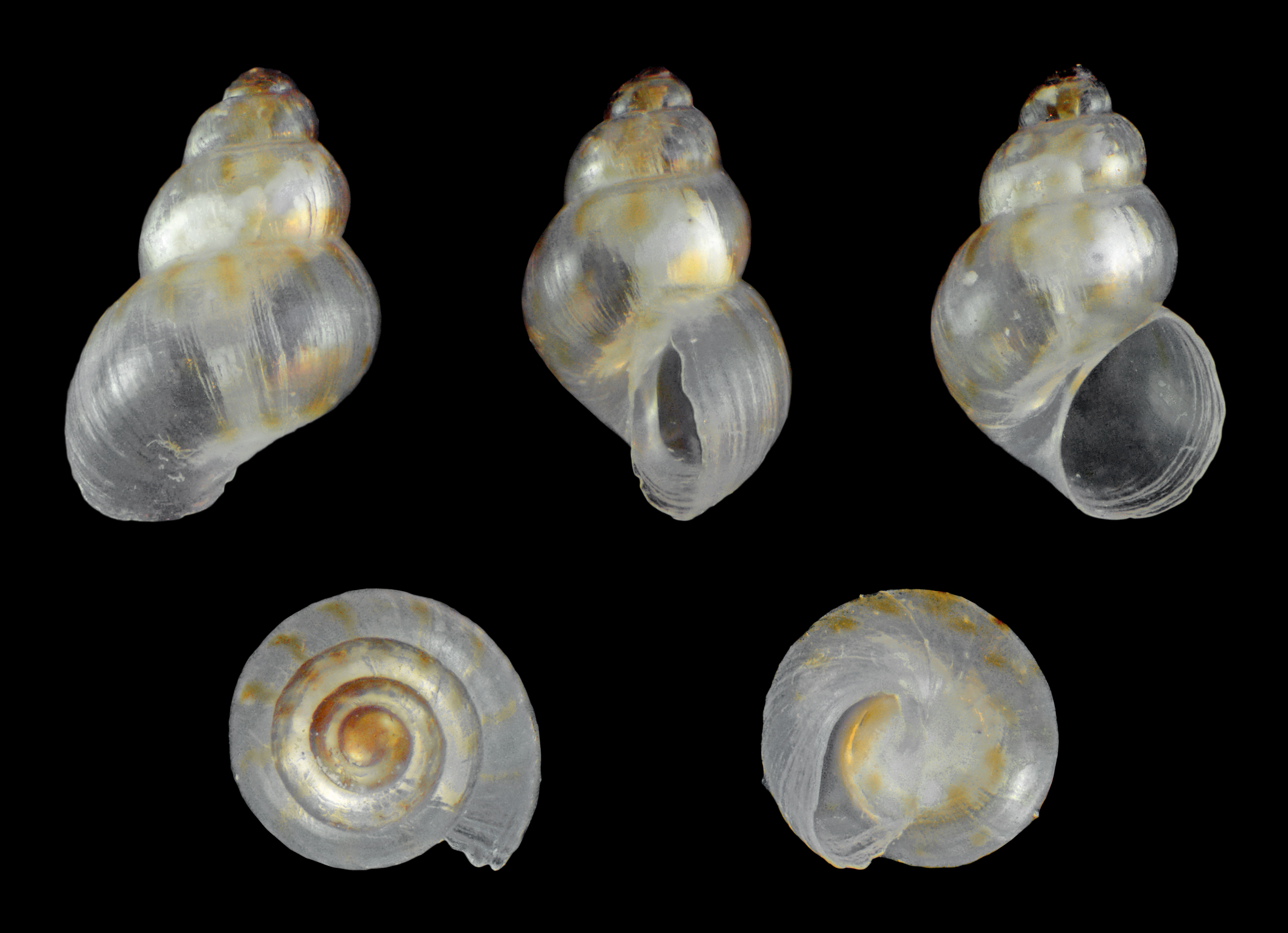

Scientific classification
- Kingdom: Animalia
- Phylum: Mollusca
- Class: Gastropoda
- Subclass: Caenogastropoda
- Order: Littorinimorpha
- Family: Rissoidae
- Genus: Setia
- Species: S. amabilis

Binomial name
- Setia amabilis (Locard, 1886)

Synonyms
- Cingula amabilis Locard, 1886

= Setia amabilis =

Species of gastropod

Setia amabilis is a species of minute sea snail, a marine gastropod mollusk or micromollusk in the family Rissoidae.
