= Obtusella orisparvi =

Scientific classification
- Kingdom: Animalia
- Phylum: Mollusca
- Class: Gastropoda
- Subclass: Caenogastropoda
- Order: Littorinimorpha
- Family: Rissoidae
- Genus: Obtusella
- Species: O. orisparvi

Binomial name
- Obtusella orisparvi Moreno, Peñas & Rolán, 2003

Species of gastropod

Obtusella orisparvi is a species of minute sea snail, a marine gastropod mollusk or micromollusk in the family Rissoidae.
