= Crisilla gagliniae =

Scientific classification
- Kingdom: Animalia
- Phylum: Mollusca
- Class: Gastropoda
- Subclass: Caenogastropoda
- Order: Littorinimorpha
- Family: Rissoidae
- Genus: Crisilla
- Species: C. gagliniae

Binomial name
- Crisilla gagliniae (Amati, 1985)

Synonyms
- Alvania gagliniae Amati, 1985; Rissoa granulum var. tenuiplicata Seguenza G., 1876 (dubious syn.)

Species of gastropod

Crisilla gagliniae is a species of small sea snail, a marine gastropod mollusk or micromollusk in the family Rissoidae.
