= Setia gittenbergeri =

Scientific classification
- Kingdom: Animalia
- Phylum: Mollusca
- Class: Gastropoda
- Subclass: Caenogastropoda
- Order: Littorinimorpha
- Family: Rissoidae
- Genus: Setia
- Species: S. gittenbergeri

Binomial name
- Setia gittenbergeri (Verduin, 1984)

Synonyms
- Cingula gittenbergeri Verduin, 1984

Species of gastropod

Setia gittenbergeri is a species of minute sea snail, a marine gastropod mollusk or micromollusk in the family Rissoidae.
