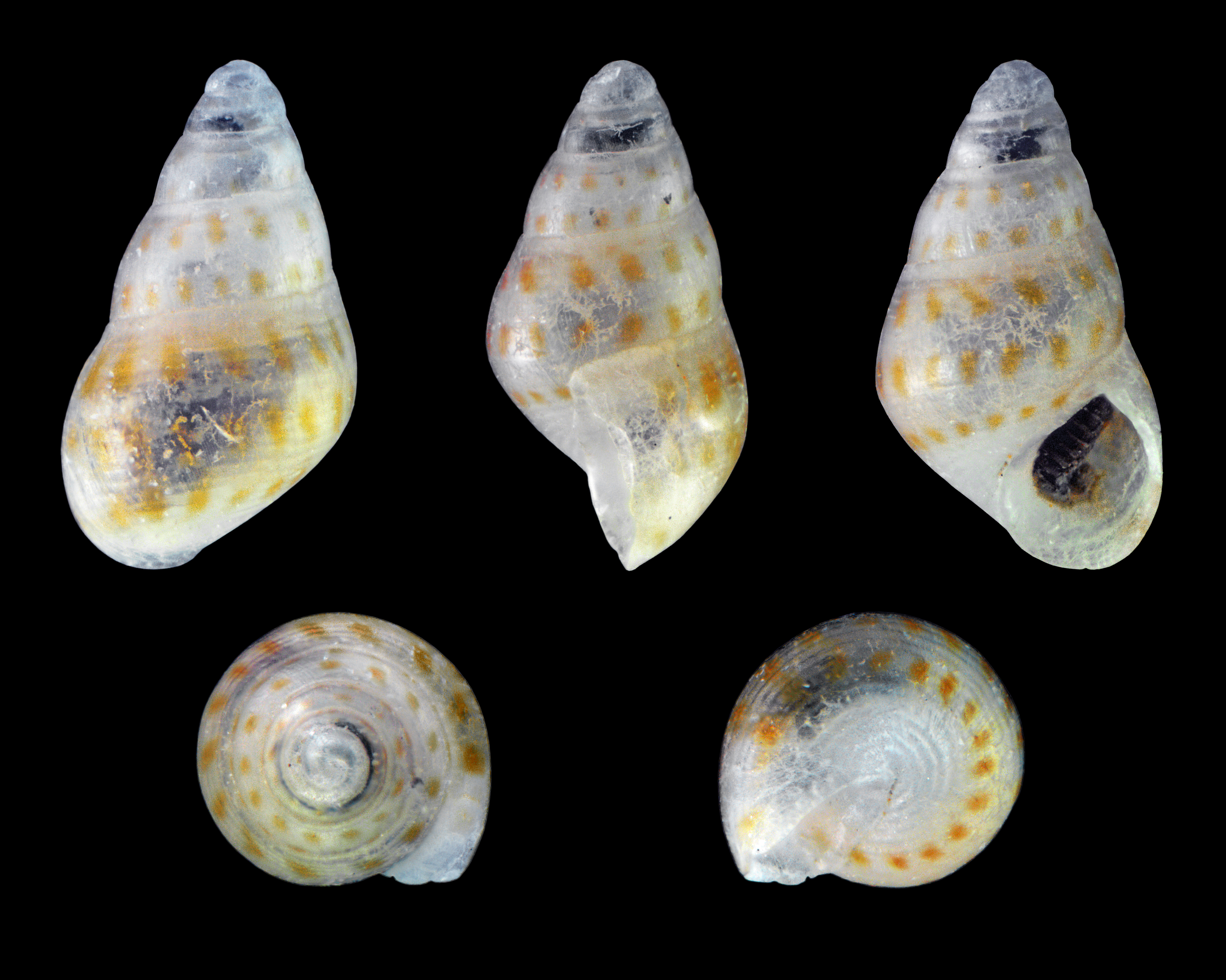

Scientific classification
- Kingdom: Animalia
- Phylum: Mollusca
- Class: Gastropoda
- Subclass: Caenogastropoda
- Order: Littorinimorpha
- Family: Rissoidae
- Genus: Crisilla
- Species: C. picta

Binomial name
- Crisilla picta (Jeffreys, 1867)

Synonyms
- Rissoa picta Jeffreys, 1867; Auriconoba watsoni Nordsieck, 1972; Cingula picta (Jeffreys, 1867)

= Crisilla picta =

Species of gastropod

Crisilla picta is a species of small sea snail with an operculum; this organism is a marine gastropod mollusk or micromollusk in the family Rissoidae.

== Distribution ==
- Madeira

== Original description ==
Crisilla picta was originally collected by Reverend Robert Boog Watson in Madeira and it was sent to British malacologist John Gwyn Jeffreys, who described it as a new species under name Rissoa picta in 1867. Jeffreys's original text (the type description) reads as follows:

Rissoa picta

Shell conic-oval, rather solid, semitransparent, and glossy: sculpture, numerous (although not close-set) slight, equal-sized, spiral striae, which cover the body-whorl, but are not discernible on the upper whorls; there is no labial rib: colour pale yellowish-white, variegated by equidistant rows of oblong reddish-brown spots; the body-whorl has three rows (the lower two being sometimes partially confluent), and each of the upper three whorls has two rows: spire rather short, bluntly pointed: whorls five and a half, somewhat compressed, encircled below the suture by a thickened rim, owing to the last-formed whorl overlapping the preceding one in that part; the body-whorl occupies about two-thirds of the shell: suture slight; mouth roundish oval, not expanded: outer lip sharp: inner lip reflected on the pillar and base, united above with the outer lip: pillar broad and flattened: operculum yellowish, rather thick, nearly smooth; spire or nucleus small, and placed on the inner side near the base. Length 0.075 in., breadth 0.05. Habitat. Under stones at low-water mark, Madeira (Watson); not uncommon.

The nearest ally to this pretty little shell is R. semistriata, from which it differs not only in the smaller size, but in the whorls being flatter, the sculpture equal and not confined to the upper and lower portions of the body-whorl, and in having three (instead of two) rows of coloured spots on that whorl, and two

on each of the preceding whorls.

The height of the shell is 0.075 inches (1.9 mm). The width of the shell is 0.05 inches (1.3 mm).
