= Crisilla senegalensis =

Scientific classification
- Kingdom: Animalia
- Phylum: Mollusca
- Class: Gastropoda
- Subclass: Caenogastropoda
- Order: Littorinimorpha
- Family: Rissoidae
- Genus: Crisilla
- Species: C. senegalensis

Binomial name
- Crisilla senegalensis Rolán & Hernández, 2006

Species of gastropod

Crisilla senegalensis is a species of small sea snail, a marine gastropod mollusc or micromollusc in the family Rissoidae.
