= Setia valvatoides =

Scientific classification
- Kingdom: Animalia
- Phylum: Mollusca
- Class: Gastropoda
- Subclass: Caenogastropoda
- Order: Littorinimorpha
- Family: Rissoidae
- Genus: Setia
- Species: S. valvatoides

Binomial name
- Setia valvatoides (Milaschewitsch, 1909)

Synonyms
- Rissoa valvatoides Milaschewitsch, 1909

Species of gastropod

Setia valvatoides is a species of minute sea snail, a marine gastropod mollusk or micromollusk in the family Rissoidae.
