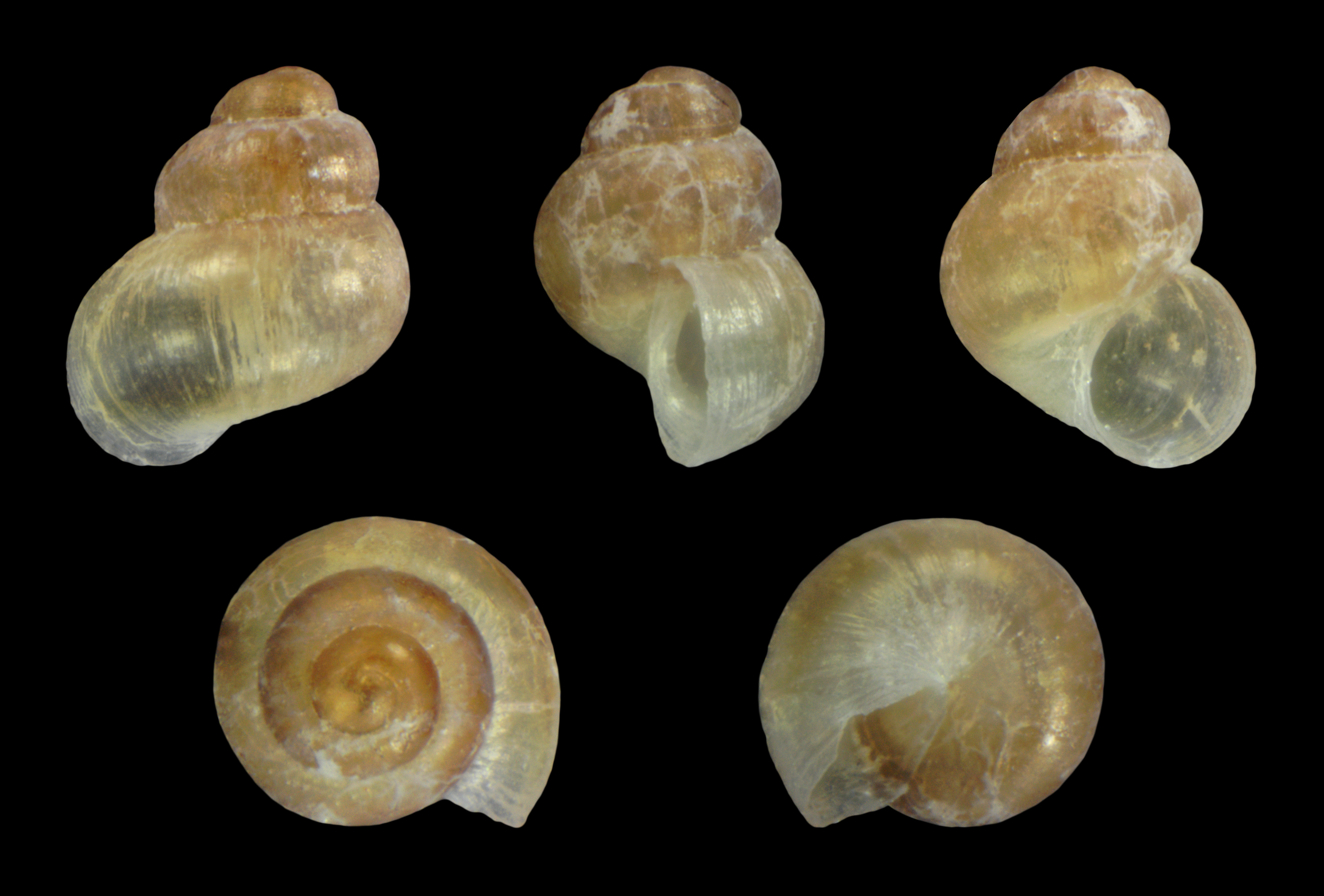

Scientific classification
- Kingdom: Animalia
- Phylum: Mollusca
- Class: Gastropoda
- Subclass: Caenogastropoda
- Order: Littorinimorpha
- Family: Rissoidae
- Genus: Setia
- Species: S. lacourti

Binomial name
- Setia lacourti (Verduin, 1984)

Synonyms
- Cingula lacourti Verduin, 1984

= Setia lacourti =

Species of gastropod

Setia lacourti is a species of minute sea snail, a marine gastropod mollusk or micromollusk in the family Rissoidae.
