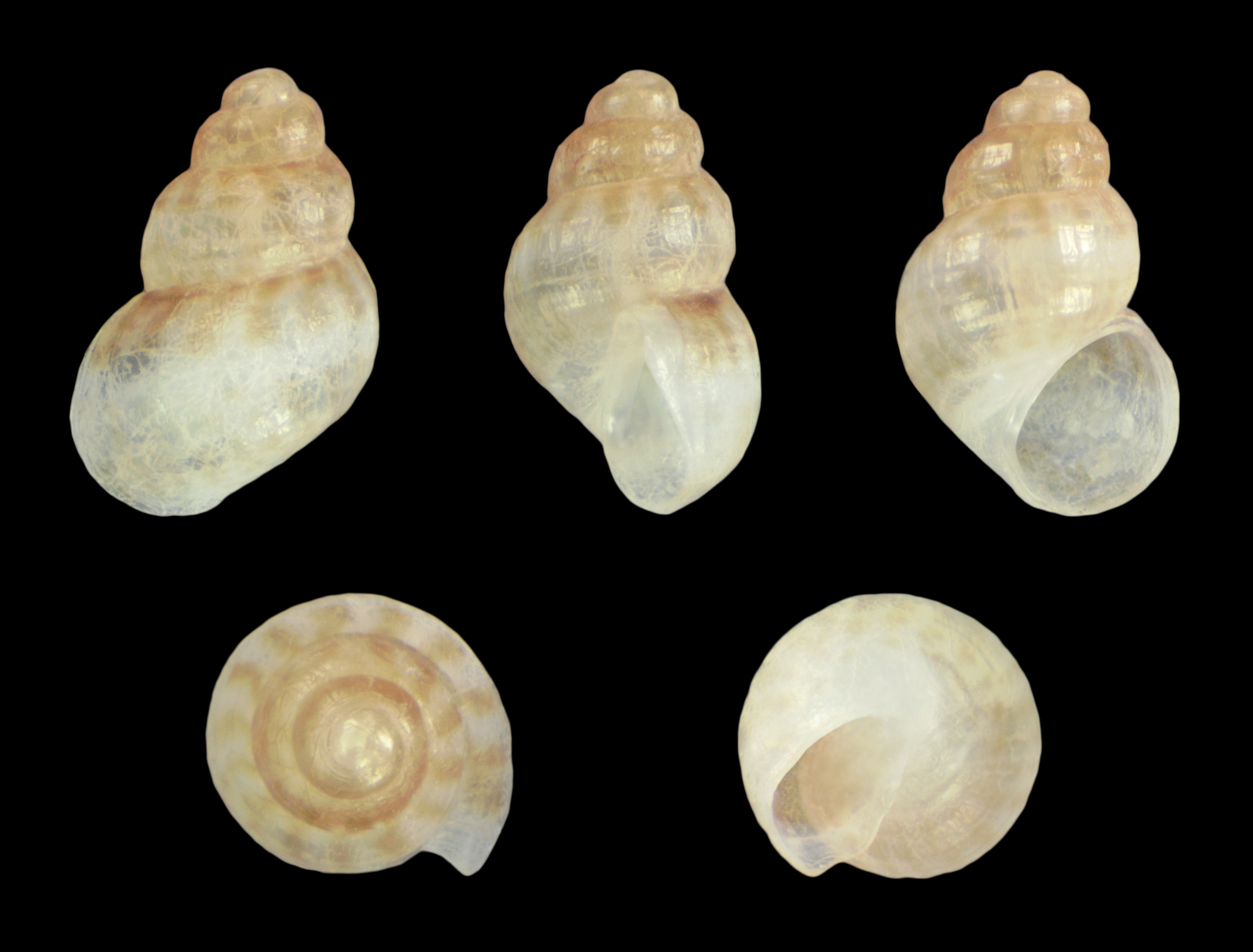

Scientific classification
- Kingdom: Animalia
- Phylum: Mollusca
- Class: Gastropoda
- Subclass: Caenogastropoda
- Order: Littorinimorpha
- Family: Rissoidae
- Genus: Setia
- Species: S. ambigua

Binomial name
- Setia ambigua (Brugnone, 1873)

Synonyms
- Rissoa alleryana Aradas & Benoit, 1874; Rissoa ambigua Brugnone, 1873

= Setia ambigua =

Species of gastropod

Setia ambigua is a species of minute sea snail, a marine gastropod mollusk or micromollusk in the family Rissoidae.

== Description ==
Members of the order Neotaenioglossa are mostly gonochoric and broadcast spawners. Life cycle: Embryos develop into planktonic trochophore larvae and later into juvenile veligers before becoming fully grown adults.

== Distribution ==
Mediterranean Sea.
