= Obtusella erinacea =

Scientific classification
- Kingdom: Animalia
- Phylum: Mollusca
- Class: Gastropoda
- Subclass: Caenogastropoda
- Order: Littorinimorpha
- Family: Rissoidae
- Genus: Obtusella
- Species: O. erinacea

Binomial name
- Obtusella erinacea (Linnaeus, 1758)

Species of gastropod

Obtusella erinacea is a species of minute sea snail, a marine gastropod mollusk or micromollusk in the family Rissoidae.
