= Setia microbia =

Scientific classification
- Kingdom: Animalia
- Phylum: Mollusca
- Class: Gastropoda
- Subclass: Caenogastropoda
- Order: Littorinimorpha
- Family: Rissoidae
- Genus: Setia
- Species: S. microbia

Binomial name
- Setia microbia Hoenselaar & Hoenselaar, 1991

Species of gastropod

Setia microbia is a species of small sea snail, a marine gastropod mollusk or micromollusk in the family Rissoidae.
