= Setia latior =

Scientific classification
- Kingdom: Animalia
- Phylum: Mollusca
- Class: Gastropoda
- Subclass: Caenogastropoda
- Order: Littorinimorpha
- Family: Rissoidae
- Genus: Setia
- Species: S. latior

Binomial name
- Setia latior (Mighels & Adams, 1842)

Synonyms
- Alvania latior (Mighels & Adams, 1842); Cingula latior Mighels & Adams, 1842

Species of gastropod

Setia latior is a species of small sea snail, a marine gastropod mollusk or micromollusk in the family Rissoidae.

== Description ==
The maximum recorded shell length is 2 mm.

== Habitat ==
Minimum recorded depth is 27 m. Maximum recorded depth is 90 m.
