= Crisilla marioni =

Scientific classification
- Kingdom: Animalia
- Phylum: Mollusca
- Class: Gastropoda
- Subclass: Caenogastropoda
- Order: Littorinimorpha
- Family: Rissoidae
- Genus: Crisilla
- Species: C. marioni

Binomial name
- Crisilla marioni Fasulo & Gaglini, 1987

Synonyms
- Alvania marioni Fasulo & Gaglini, 1987<

Species of gastropod

Crisilla marioni is a species of small sea snail, a marine gastropod mollusk or micromollusk in the family Rissoidae.
