= Setia nicoleae =

Scientific classification
- Kingdom: Animalia
- Phylum: Mollusca
- Class: Gastropoda
- Subclass: Caenogastropoda
- Order: Littorinimorpha
- Family: Rissoidae
- Genus: Setia
- Species: S. nicoleae

Binomial name
- Setia nicoleae Segers, Swinnen & De Prins, 2009

Species of gastropod

Setia nicoleae is a species of minute sea snail, a marine gastropod mollusk or micromollusk in the family Rissoidae.
