= Crisilla morenoi =

Scientific classification
- Kingdom: Animalia
- Phylum: Mollusca
- Class: Gastropoda
- Subclass: Caenogastropoda
- Order: Littorinimorpha
- Family: Rissoidae
- Genus: Crisilla
- Species: C. morenoi

Binomial name
- Crisilla morenoi Templado & Rolán, 1994

Species of gastropod

Crisilla morenoi is a species of small sea snail, a marine gastropod mollusk or micromollusk in the family Rissoidae.
