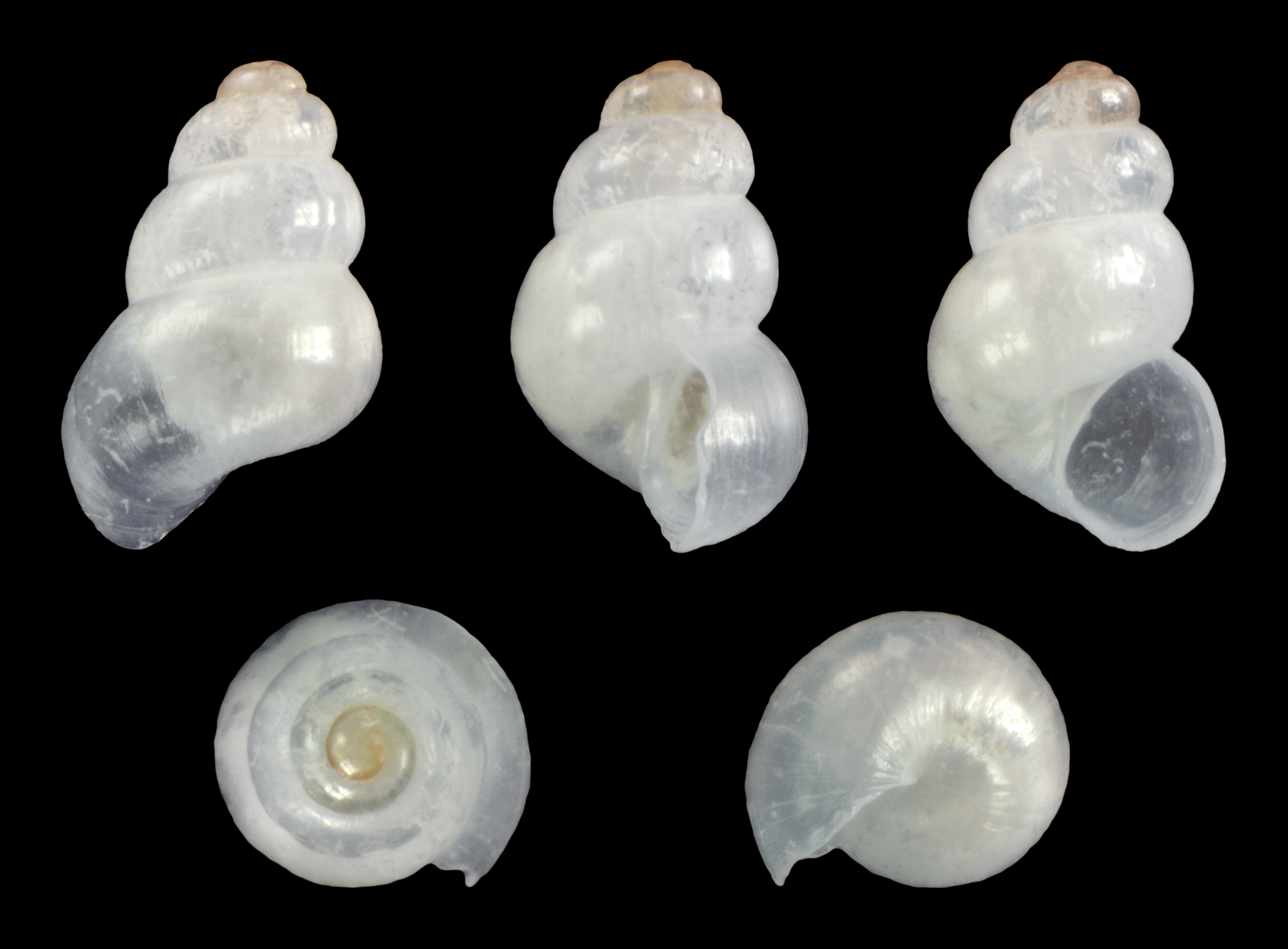

Scientific classification
- Kingdom: Animalia
- Phylum: Mollusca
- Class: Gastropoda
- Subclass: Caenogastropoda
- Order: Littorinimorpha
- Family: Rissoidae
- Genus: Obtusella
- Species: O. macilenta

Binomial name
- Obtusella macilenta (Monterosato, 1880)

= Obtusella macilenta =

Species of mollusc

Obtusella macilenta is a species of small sea snail, a marine gastropod mollusk or micromollusk in the family Rissoidae.
