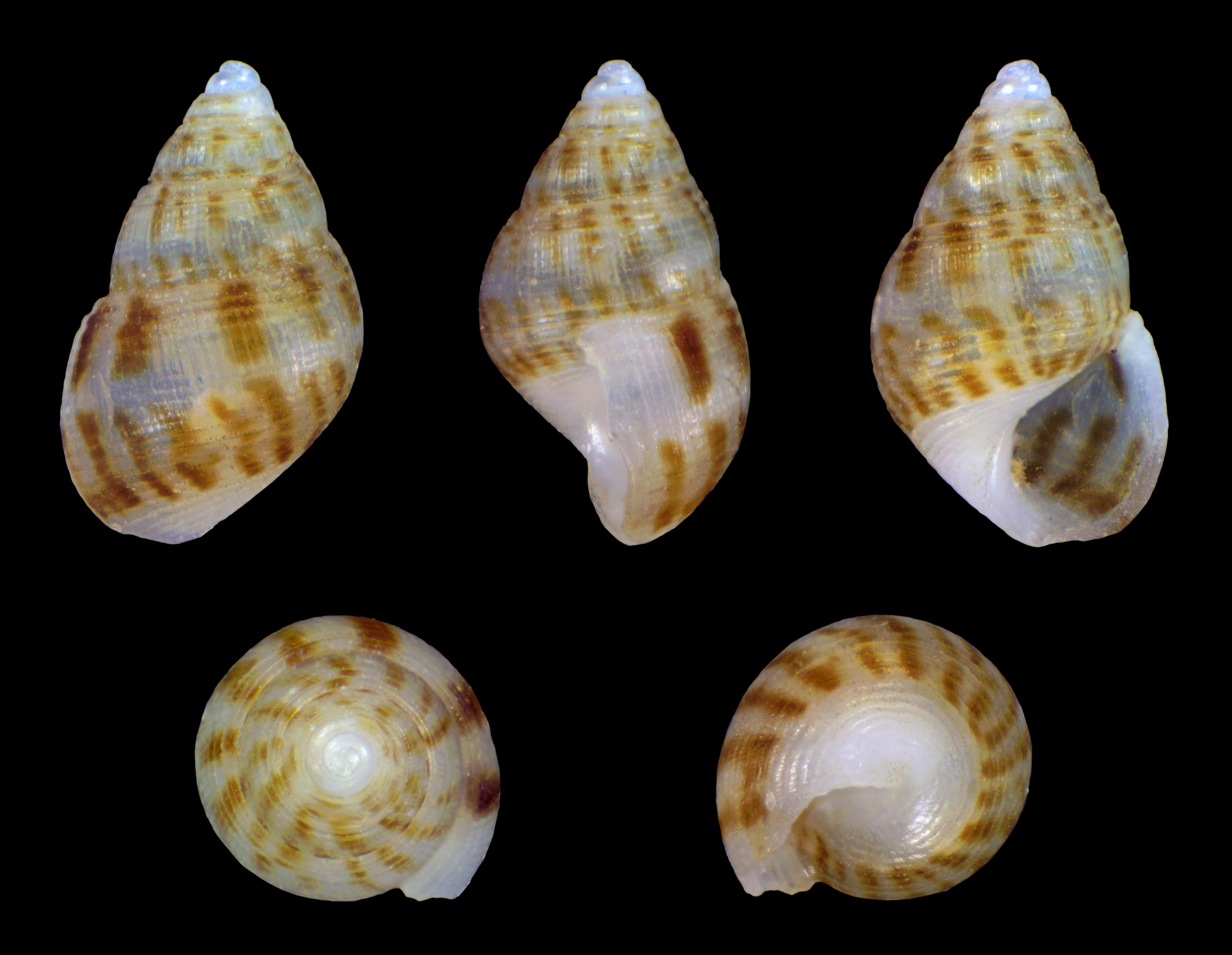

Scientific classification
- Kingdom: Animalia
- Phylum: Mollusca
- Class: Gastropoda
- Subclass: Caenogastropoda
- Order: Littorinimorpha
- Family: Rissoidae
- Genus: Crisilla
- Species: C. semistriata

Binomial name
- Crisilla semistriata (Montagu, 1808)

Synonyms
- Alvania semistriata (Montagu, 1808); Cingula semistriata Montagu; Setia marmorata (Cantraine, 1842); Setia subsulcata (Philippi, 1844)<

= Crisilla semistriata =

Species of gastropod

Crisilla semistriata is a species of small sea snail, a marine gastropod mollusk or micromollusk in the family Rissoidae.
