= Crisilla ugesae =

Scientific classification
- Kingdom: Animalia
- Phylum: Mollusca
- Class: Gastropoda
- Subclass: Caenogastropoda
- Order: Littorinimorpha
- Family: Rissoidae
- Genus: Crisilla
- Species: C. ugesae

Binomial name
- Crisilla ugesae (Verduin, 1988)

Synonyms
- Setia ugesae Verduin, 1988 ·

Species of gastropod

Crisilla ugesae is a species of small sea snail, a marine gastropod mollusk or micromollusk in the family Rissoidae.
