= Obtusella roseotincta =

Scientific classification
- Kingdom: Animalia
- Phylum: Mollusca
- Class: Gastropoda
- Subclass: Caenogastropoda
- Order: Littorinimorpha
- Family: Rissoidae
- Genus: Obtusella
- Species: O. roseotincta

Binomial name
- Obtusella roseotincta (Dautzenberg, 1889)

Species of gastropod

Obtusella roseotincta is a species of small sea snail, a marine gastropod mollusc or micromollusk in the family Rissoidae.
