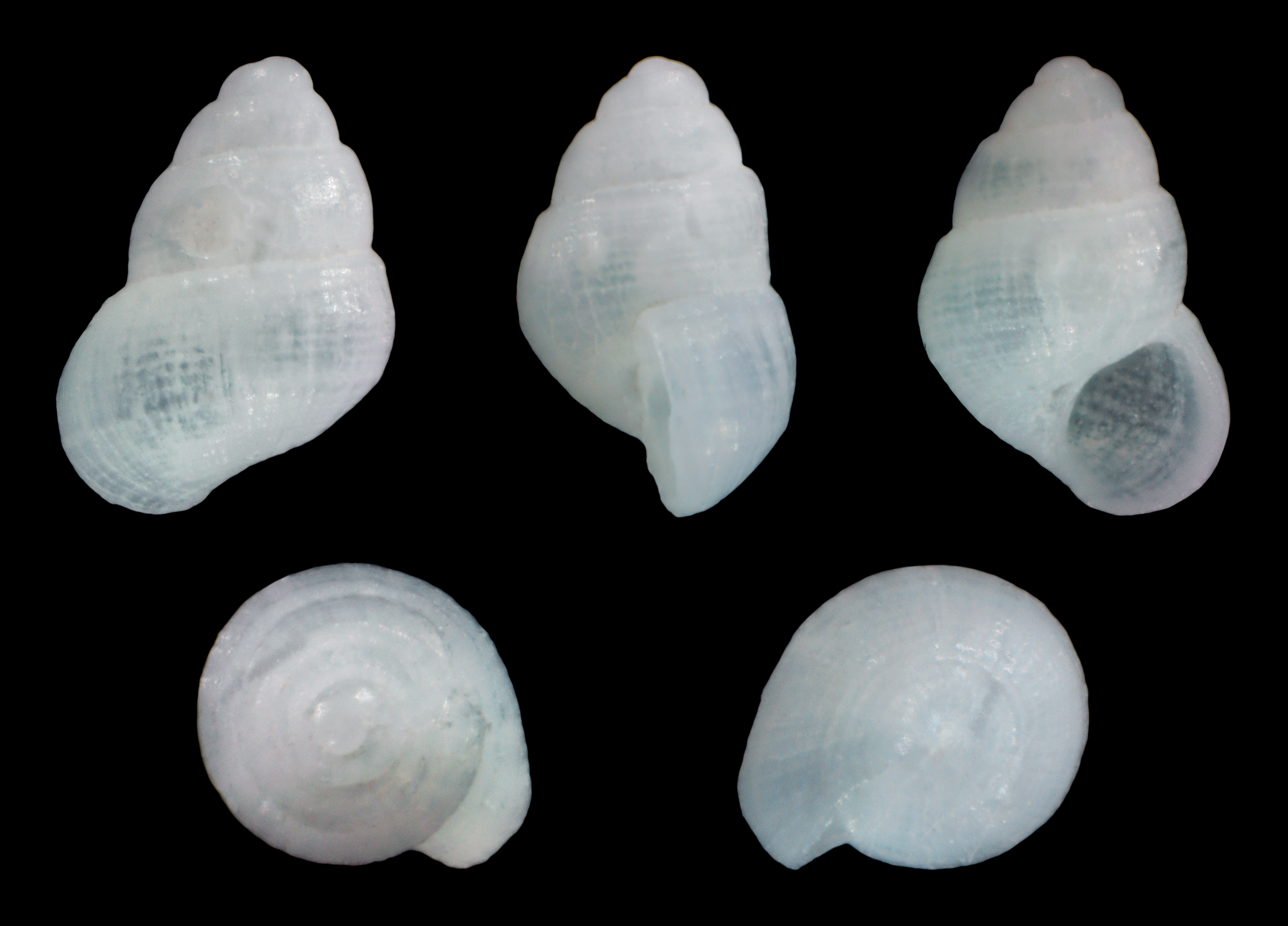

Scientific classification
- Kingdom: Animalia
- Phylum: Mollusca
- Class: Gastropoda
- Subclass: Caenogastropoda
- Order: Littorinimorpha
- Family: Rissoidae
- Genus: Voorwindia
- Species: V. tiberiana

Binomial name
- Voorwindia tiberiana (Issel, 1869)

Synonyms
- Setia tiberiana (Issel, 1869)

= Voorwindia tiberiana =

Species of gastropod

Voorwindia tiberiana is a species of minute sea snail, a marine gastropod mollusk or micromollusk in the family Rissoidae.

== Description ==
The size of its minute shell is 0.7mm.

== Distribution ==
This species is found in the Red Sea.
