= Pseudosetia turgida =

- Pseudosetia turgida shell

Scientific classification
- Kingdom: Animalia
- Phylum: Mollusca
- Class: Gastropoda
- Subclass: Caenogastropoda
- Order: Littorinimorpha
- Family: Rissoidae
- Genus: Pseudosetia
- Species: P. turgida

Binomial name
- Pseudosetia turgida (Jeffreys, 1870)

Synonyms
- Alvania turgida (Verrill, 1880); Setia turgida (Jeffreys, 1870)<

Species of gastropod

Pseudosetia turgida is a species of minute sea snail, a marine gastropod mollusk or micromollusk in the family Rissoidae.
