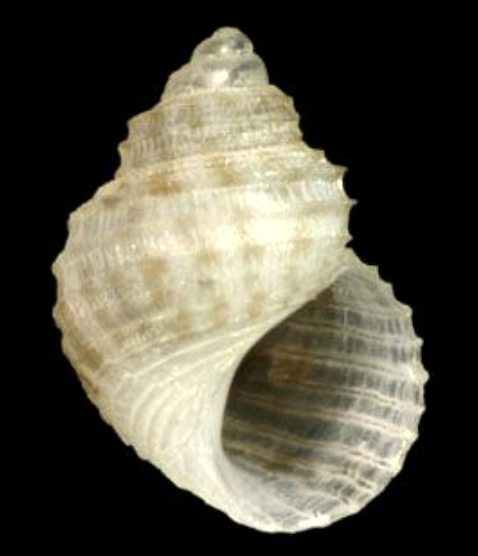
- Shell of Alvania tenera (specimen at the Natural History Museum, Rotterdam)

Scientific classification
- Kingdom: Animalia
- Phylum: Mollusca
- Class: Gastropoda
- Subclass: Caenogastropoda
- Order: Littorinimorpha
- Superfamily: Rissooidea
- Family: Rissoidae
- Genus: Alvania
- Species: A. tenera

Binomial name
- Alvania tenera (Philippi, 1844)

Synonyms
- Crisilla tenera (R. A. Philippi, 1844) superseded combination; Rissoa tenera R. A. Philippi, 1844 superseded combination

= Alvania tenera =

Species of gastropod

Alvania tenera is a species of small sea snail, a marine gastropod mollusc or micromollusk in the family Rissoidae.

== Description ==
The length of the shell varies between 1.6 mm and 3 mm.

The thin shell is pellucid and brownish white. it contains 5 whorls, with a deep suture, and strong spiral ridges, of which there are 9-10 on the body whorl. The wider interstices are slightly longitudinally striated. The outer lip is simple and dentate by the ridges.

== Distribution ==
This species occurs in the Western and Central Mediterranean Sea.
