= Crisilla maculata =

Scientific classification
- Kingdom: Animalia
- Phylum: Mollusca
- Class: Gastropoda
- Subclass: Caenogastropoda
- Order: Littorinimorpha
- Family: Rissoidae
- Genus: Crisilla
- Species: C. maculata

Binomial name
- Crisilla maculata (Monterosato, 1869)

Synonyms
- Cingula maculata Monterosato, 1869; Setia maculata (Monterosato, 1869)

Species of gastropod

Crisilla maculata is a species of small sea snail, a marine gastropod mollusk or micromollusk in the family Rissoidae.
