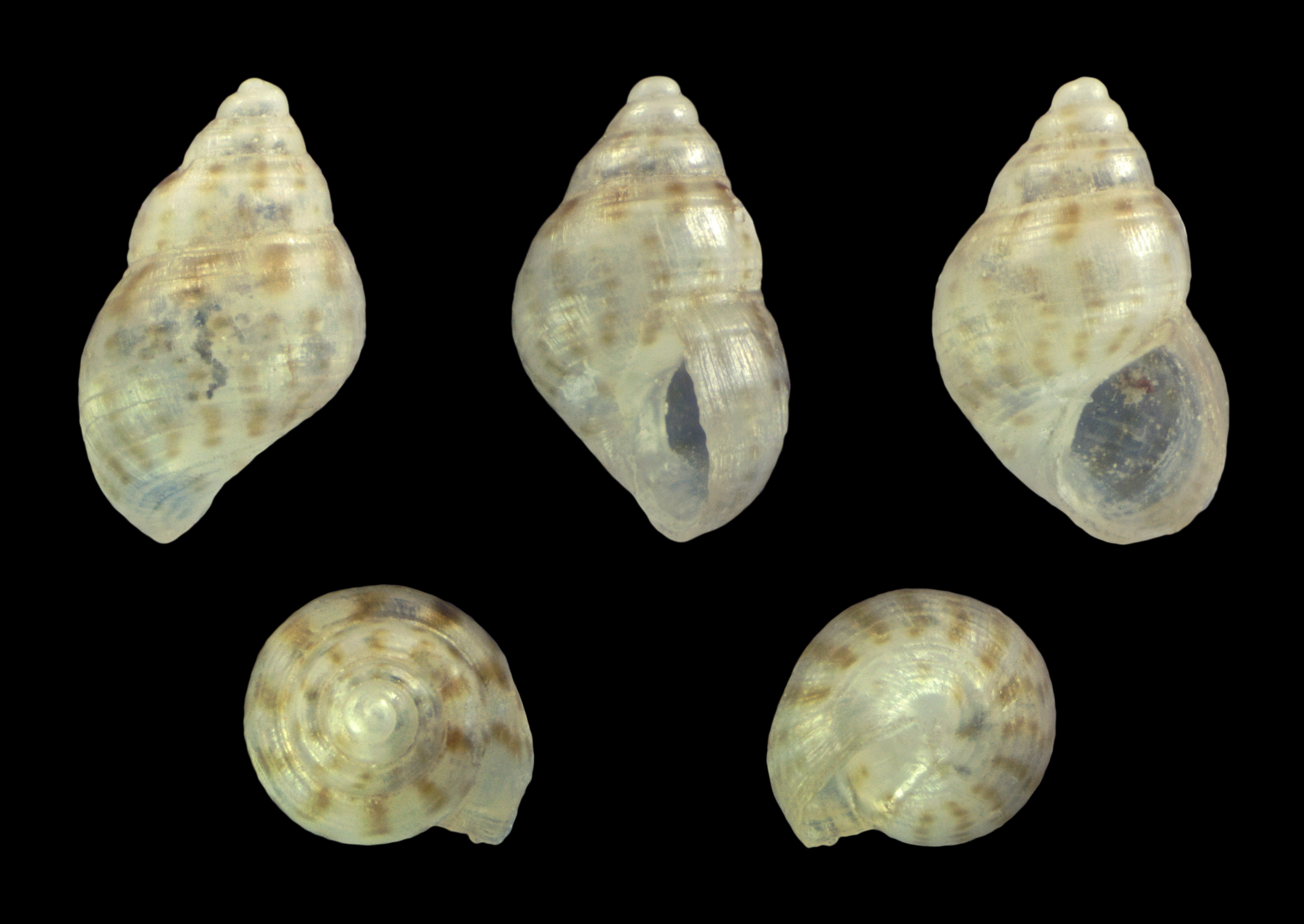

Scientific classification
- Kingdom: Animalia
- Phylum: Mollusca
- Class: Gastropoda
- Subclass: Caenogastropoda
- Order: Littorinimorpha
- Family: Rissoidae
- Genus: Crisilla
- Species: C. iunoniae

Binomial name
- Crisilla iunoniae (Palazzi, 1988)

Synonyms
- Alvania iunoniae Palazzi, 1988; Setia lidyae Verduin, 1988

= Crisilla iunoniae =

Species of gastropod

Crisilla iunoniae is a species of small sea snail, a marine gastropod mollusk or micromollusk in the family Rissoidae.

== Description ==
The shell attains a length of 1.2 mm.

== Distribution ==
This marine species occurs in the Atlantic Ocean off Madeira.
