= Crisilla beniamina =

Scientific classification
- Kingdom: Animalia
- Phylum: Mollusca
- Class: Gastropoda
- Subclass: Caenogastropoda
- Order: Littorinimorpha
- Family: Rissoidae
- Genus: Crisilla
- Species: C. beniamina

Binomial name
- Crisilla beniamina (Monterosato, 1884)

Synonyms
- Alvania beniamina (Monterosato, 1884); Cingula beniamina Monterosato, 1844<

Species of gastropod

Crisilla beniamina is a species of small sea snail, a marine gastropod mollusk or micromollusk in the family Rissoidae.
