= Crisilla aartseni =

Scientific classification
- Kingdom: Animalia
- Phylum: Mollusca
- Class: Gastropoda
- Subclass: Caenogastropoda
- Order: Littorinimorpha
- Family: Rissoidae
- Genus: Crisilla
- Species: C. aartseni

Binomial name
- Crisilla aartseni (Verduin, 1984)

Synonyms
- Cingula aartseni Verduin, 1984; Setia aartseni (Verduin, 1984) (transferred to genus Crisilla)

Species of gastropod

Crisilla aartseni is a species of small sea snail, a marine gastropod mollusk or micromollusk in the family Rissoidae.

== Description ==
Shell color ranges from creamy white to a dark brown, often with splotched patterning. Its average size is about 1.5 millimeters.

== Distribution ==
It is most commonly found around the southern Spanish coast, near the Gibraltar strait and the Alboran Sea.
