= Pusillina tumidula =

Scientific classification
- Kingdom: Animalia
- Phylum: Mollusca
- Class: Gastropoda
- Subclass: Caenogastropoda
- Order: Littorinimorpha
- Family: Rissoidae
- Genus: Pusillina
- Species: P. tumidula

Binomial name
- Pusillina tumidula (G.O. Sars, 1878)

Synonyms
- Alvania minuta (Golikov & Fedjakov, 1987) (homonym of † Alvania minuta (H. J. Finlay, 1924)); Cingula griegi (Friele, 1879); Cingula tumidula G. O. Sars, 1878 (original combination); Obtusella tumidula (G. O. Sars, 1878); Punctulum minutum A. N. Golikov & Fedjakov, 1987; Pusillina (Vicinirissoa) tumidula (G. O. Sars, 1878) · alternate representation; Putilla (Pseudosetia) tumidula (G. O. Sars, 1878) superseded combination; Rissoa (Microsetia) tumidula (G. O. Sars, 1878) superseded combination; Rissoa griegi Friele, 1879; Setia tumidula (G. O. Sars, 1878)

Species of gastropod

Pusillina tumidula is a species of small sea snail, a marine gastropod mollusk or micromollusk in the family Rissoidae.

== Description ==
The shell grows to a length of 2 mm.

== Distribution ==
This species occurs in Arctic waters off the White Sea and the Okhotsk Sea.
