= Andrea Aradas =

Italian zoologist and anatomist

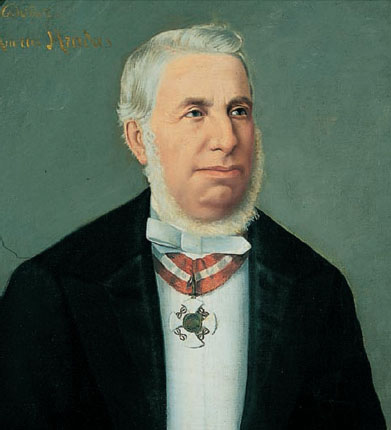
- Born: 9 July 1810; Catania, Sicily, Kingdom of Sicily
- Died: 1 November 1882 (aged 72); Viagrande, Sicily, Kingdom of Italy
- Education: University of Catania
- Known for: Malacology
- Scientific career
- Fields: Zoology, comparative anatomy
- Workplaces: University of Catania

Andrea Aradas (9 July 1810 – 1 November 1882) was an Italian zoologist and anatomist. He was one of the most important malacologists of the 19th century.

== Biography ==
Aradas was the son of Ferdinando Aradas, chief physician at the Santa Marta Hospital in Catania. His father introduced him at an early age to the intellectual milieu of the Gioenia Academy. He graduated in medicine at a young age and subsequently developed an interest in zoology, continuing his studies in the field at the University of Catania.

Aradas taught zoology at the University of Catania from 1852 and subsequently also taught comparative anatomy.

During his career, Aradas collected a large number of shells, both fossil and living. After his death, his historic collection was donated to the University of Catania. The Catania Museum of Zoology, which he founded in 1853 and which was attached to the university's Department of Animal Biology, is considered one of the earliest scientific museums in Sicily. Aradas continued to devote himself to the museum and to zoological research until his death. Another important Aradas collection, consisting of shells from around the world, particularly Sicily, was later acquired by the Civic Museum of Natural History of Milan.

== Works ==
Aradas's most important work was Conchigliologia vivente marina della Sicilia e delle isole che la circondano, written in collaboration with Luigi Benoit and published in the proceedings of the Gioenia Academy; the work appeared over several years, with the complete publication traditionally dated to 1872–1876. Aradas also served as director of the Gioenia Academy. The work is regarded as an important contribution to the study of the Mediterranean malacofauna and remains an important historical source for the molluscan fauna of Sicily.

Aradas studied the fauna of Sicily extensively, with particular emphasis on molluscs and on living and fossil echinoderms. Among his other important works was Catalogo ragionato delle conchiglie viventi e fossili di Sicilia, published in collaboration with Giacomo Maggiore during the 1840s, as well as the Monografia degli Echinidi viventi e fossili della Sicilia (1850–1853). His studies made important contributions to zoology, zoogeography, and paleontology.

In his general ideas concerning biology, Aradas defended a form of vitalism and was highly critical of Darwin's theory of evolution. He expressed these views in Ricerche e riflessioni su' principi fondamentali della scienza della vita, published in Catania in 1864. Aradas did not fully accept Darwinian evolutionary theory.
