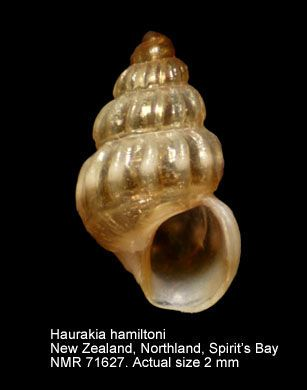
- Shell of Haurakia hamiltoni

Scientific classification
- Kingdom: Animalia
- Phylum: Mollusca
- Class: Gastropoda
- Subclass: Caenogastropoda
- Order: Littorinimorpha
- Superfamily: Rissooidea
- Family: Rissoidae
- Genus: Haurakia; Iredale, 1915

Type species
- Rissoa hamiltoni Suter, 1898

Synonyms
- Haurakiopsis Powell, 1937 ·; Pusillina (Haurakia) Iredale, 1915; Rissoa (Haurakia) Iredale, 1915; Vitricithna Laseron, 1956

= Haurakia =

Genus of gastropods

Haurakia is a genus of minute sea snails, marine gastropod mollusks or micromollusks in the family Rissoidae.

== Species ==
- Haurakia africana (Thiele, 1925)
- Haurakia amica (Thiele, 1925)
- Haurakia angulata (Hedley, 1907)
- Haurakia aupouria (Powell, 1937)
- Haurakia averni (Ponder & Worsfold, 1994)
- † Haurakia buccella Marwick, 1931
- † Haurakia chemnitzia Laws, 1948
- † Haurakia crassicosta May, 1922
- Haurakia crassicosta Powell, 1955 (accepted > unreplaced junior homonym)
- Haurakia denseclathrata (Thiele, 1925)
- Haurakia discrepans (Tate & May, 1900)
- Haurakia finlayi Powell, 1937
- Haurakia gilva (W. H. Turton, 1932)
- Haurakia hamiltoni (Suter, 1898)
- Haurakia hertzogi (Thiele, 1925)
- Haurakia huttoni (Suter, 1898)
- Haurakia imitator (Thiele, 1930)
- Haurakia infecta (Suter, 1908)
- Haurakia latiambita (Ponder, 1967)
- Haurakia marmorata (Hedley, 1907)
- † Haurakia marshalli (Grant-Mackie & Chapman-Smith, 1971)
- Haurakia mediolaevis Cotton, 1944
- Haurakia minuscula Powell, 1955
- Haurakia mobilicosta (Ponder, 1967)
- Haurakia novarensis (Frauenfeld, 1867)
- † Haurakia oamarutica Finlay, 1924
- Haurakia occulta (Thiele, 1925)
- † Haurakia onerata Laws, 1939
- Haurakia otagoensis Dell, 1956
- Haurakia pellucida (Powell, 1937)
- Haurakia praeda (Hedley, 1908)
- Haurakia profundior (Hedley, 1907)
- Haurakia relativa (Laseron, 1956)
- Haurakia semireticulata (Murdoch & Suter, 1906)
- Haurakia sinuastoma (Ponder, 1967)
- † Haurakia sodalis Laws, 1939
- Haurakia subsuturalis Dell, 1956
- Haurakia sufflava (Cecalupo & Perugia, 2009)
- † Haurakia tenuisculpta Laws, 1950
- Haurakia wallacei (W. R. B. Oliver, 1915)

Synonyms

- Haurakia aupouria Powell, 1937: synonym of Alvania (Linemera) aupouria (Powell, 1937) represented as Alvania aupouria (Powell, 1937)
- † Haurakia basispiralis Chapman-Smith & Grant-Mackie, 1971: synonym of † Diala basispiralis (Chapman-Smith & Grant-Mackie, 1971) : synonym of † Diala semistriata (Philippi, 1849)
- Haurakia bountyensis Dell, 1950: synonym of Alvania (Linemera) bountyensis (Dell, 1950) represented as Alvania bountyensis (Dell, 1950) (original combination)
- Haurakia duplicata Powell, 1937: synonym of Onoba (Ovirissoa) duplicata (Powell, 1937) represented as Onoba duplicata (Powell, 1937)
- Haurakia firma Laseron, 1956: synonym of Alvania novarensis Frauenfeld, 1867: synonym of Haurakia novarensis (Frauenfeld, 1867) (Junior subjective synonym)
- Haurakia formosita Laseron, 1956: synonym of Alvania novarensis Frauenfeld, 1867: synonym of Haurakia novarensis (Frauenfeld, 1867) (Junior subjective synonym)
- Haurakia isolata Laseron, 1956: synonym of Alvania isolata (Laseron, 1956)
- Haurakia kermadecensis W. R. B. Oliver, 1915: synonym of Alvania kermadecensis (W. R. B. Oliver, 1915)
- Haurakia liddelliana (Hedley, 1907): synonym of Parashiela liddelliana (Hedley, 1907) (Does not belong to Haurakia)
- Haurakia lucida Laseron, 1950: synonym of Chrysallida lucida (Laseron, 1950)
- † Haurakia mixta Finlay, 1924: synonym of † Pisinna impressa (Hutton, 1885)
- Haurakia venusta Powell, 1926: synonym of Alvania venusta (Powell, 1926) (original combination)
