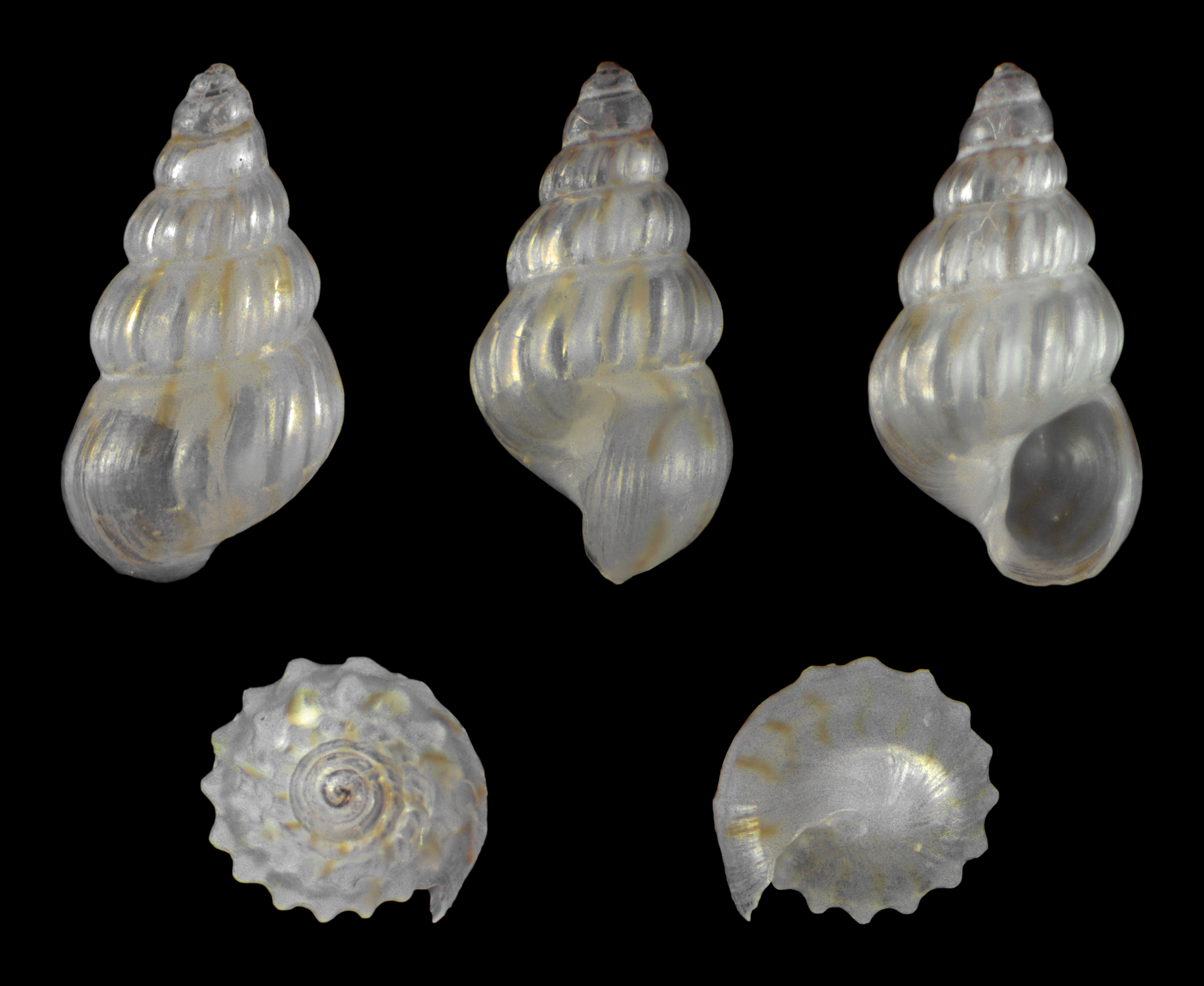
- Pusillina philippi (Aradas & Maggiore, 1844)

Scientific classification
- Kingdom: Animalia
- Phylum: Mollusca
- Class: Gastropoda
- Subclass: Caenogastropoda
- Order: Littorinimorpha
- Superfamily: Rissooidea
- Family: Rissoidae
- Genus: Pusillina; Monterosato, 1884

Type species
- Rissoa pusilla Philippi, 1836

Species
- See text

Synonyms
- Mutiturboella Nordsieck, 1972 · unaccepted; Pusillina (Pusillina) Monterosato, 1884; Pusillina (Vicinirissoa) Ponder, 1985 · accepted, alternate representation; Radiata · unaccepted (Variant spelling of Radiatia); Rissoa (Sabanea) Leach in Gray, 1847 sensu Monterosato, 1884 · unaccepted; Sabanea Leach in Gray, 1847 sensu Monterosato, 1884 · unaccepted (misspelling and misapplication); Turboella (Benzia) Nordsieck, 1972; Turboella (Mutiturboella) Nordsieck, 1972; Turboella (Radiatia) Nordsieck, 1972; Turgidina Verduin, 1979

= Pusillina =

Genus of gastropods

Pusillina is a genus of minute sea snails, marine gastropod mollusks or micromollusks in the family Rissoidae.

== Species ==
Species within the genus Pusillina include:

- Pusillina amblia (Watson, 1886)
- † Pusillina aquensis Lozouet, 2015
- Pusillina benzi (Aradas & Maggiore, 1844)
- † Pusillina dollfusi Landau, Ceulemans & Van Dingenen, 2018
- Pusillina ehrenbergii (Philippi, 1844)
- Pusillina fuscapex Gofas, 2007
- † Pusillina gallica Landau, Ceulemans & Van Dingenen, 2018
- † Pusillina grateloupi (Vergneau-Saubade, 1968)
- Pusillina hadra Bouchet & Warén, 1993
- Pusillina harpa (A. E. Verrill, 1880)
- Pusillina harpula Gofas, 2007
- Pusillina inconspicua (Alder, 1844)
- † Pusillina kazakhstanica Amitrov, 2010
- † Pusillina lavallei Seguenza, 1903
- Pusillina lineolata (Michaud, 1832)
- Pusillina marginata (Michaud, 1832)
- Pusillina metivieri Bouchet & Warén, 1993
- Pusillina minialba Segers, Swinnen & De Prins, 2009
- Pusillina munda (Monterosato, 1884)
- † Pusillina nilae Bogi & Chirli, 2004
- Pusillina obscura (Philippi, 1844)
- Pusillina philippi (Aradas & Maggiore, 1844)
- Pusillina plicosa (E. A. Smith, 1875)
- † Pusillina protocarinata Lozouet, 2015
- Pusillina radiata (Philippi, 1836)
- Pusillina sarsii (Lovén, 1846)
- Pusillina testudae (Verduin, 1979)
- Pusillina tumidula (G. O. Sars, 1878)

Species brought into synonymy

- Pusillina africana (Thiele, 1925): synonym of Haurakia africana (Thiele, 1925)
- Pusillina amica (Thiele, 1925): synonym of Haurakia amica (Thiele, 1925)
- Pusillina angulata (Hedley, 1907): synonym of Haurakia angulata (Hedley, 1907)
- Pusillina aupouria (Powell, 1937): synonym of Haurakia aupouria Powell, 1937: synonym of Alvania (Linemera) aupouria (Powell, 1937) represented as Alvania aupouria (Powell, 1937)
- Pusillina averni Ponder & Worsfold, 1994: synonym of Haurakia averni (Ponder & Worsfold, 1994)
- † Pusillina buccella (Marwick, 1931) : synonym of † Haurakia buccella Marwick, 1931
- † Pusillina chemnitzia (Laws, 1948) : synonym of † Haurakia chemnitzia Laws, 1948
- Pusillina crassicosta (Powell, 1955): synonym of Haurakia crassicosta Powell, 1955
- Pusillina denseclathrata (Thiele, 1925): synonym of Haurakia denseclathrata (Thiele, 1925)
- Pusillina discrepans (Tate & May, 1900): synonym of Haurakia discrepans (Tate & May, 1900)
- Pusillina diversa (F. Nordsieck, 1972): synonym of Pusillina inconspicua (Alder, 1844)
- Pusillina dolium (Nyst, 1845): synonym of Pusillina philippi (Aradas & Maggiore, 1844)
- Pusillina ehrenbergii (Philippi, 1844): synonym of Pusillina ehrenbergii (Philippi, 1844) (incorrect subsequent spelling)
- Pusillina finlayi (Powell, 1937): synonym of Haurakia finlayi Powell, 1937
- Pusillina gilva (W. H. Turton, 1932): synonym of Haurakia gilva (W. H. Turton, 1932)
- Pusillina hamiltoni (Suter, 1898): synonym of Haurakia hamiltoni (Suter, 1898)
- Pusillina hertzogi (Thiele, 1925): synonym of Haurakia hertzogi (Thiele, 1925)
- Pusillina huttoni (Suter, 1898): synonym of Haurakia huttoni (Suter, 1898)
- Pusillina imitator (Thiele, 1930): synonym of Haurakia imitator (Thiele, 1930)
- Pusillina infecta (Suter, 1908): synonym of Haurakia infecta (Suter, 1908)
- Pusillina janusi (Nordsieck, 1972): synonym of Rissoa janusi (Nordsieck, 1972)
- Pusillina latiambita (Ponder, 1967): synonym of Haurakia latiambita (Ponder, 1967)
- Pusillina marmorata (Hedley, 1907): synonym of Haurakia marmorata (Hedley, 1907)
- † Pusillina marshalli (Grant-Mackie & Chapman-Smith, 1971): synonym of Haurakia marshalli (Grant-Mackie & Chapman-Smith, 1971)
- Pusillina mediolaevis (Cotton, 1944): synonym of Haurakia mediolaevis Cotton, 1944
- Pusillina minuscula (Powell, 1955): synonym of Haurakia minuscula Powell, 1955
- Pusillina mobilicosta (Ponder, 1967): synonym of Haurakia mobilicosta (Ponder, 1967)
- † Pusillina oamarutica (Finlay, 1924): synonym of † Haurakia oamarutica Finlay, 1924
- Pusillina occulta (Thiele, 1925): synonym of Haurakia occulta (Thiele, 1925)
- † Pusillina onerata (Laws, 1939): synonym of † Haurakia onerata Laws, 1939
- Pusillina otagoensis (Dell, 1956): synonym of Haurakia otagoensis Dell, 1956
- Pusillina parva (da Costa, 1778): synonym of Rissoa parva (da Costa, 1778)
- Pusillina pellucida (Powell, 1937): synonym of Haurakia pellucida (Powell, 1937)
- Pusillina praeda (Hedley, 1908): synonym of Haurakia praeda (Hedley, 1908)
- Pusillina profundior (Hedley, 1907): synonym of Haurakia profundior (Hedley, 1907)
- Pusillina quisquiliarum (Watson, 1886): synonym of Setia quisquiliarum (Watson, 1886)
- Pusillina relativa (Laseron, 1956): synonym of Haurakia relativa (Laseron, 1956)
- Pusillina sarsi [sic]: synonym of Pusillina sarsii (Lovén, 1846)
- Pusillina semireticulata (Murdoch & Suter, 1906): synonym of Haurakia semireticulata (Murdoch & Suter, 1906)
- Pusillina sinuastoma (Ponder, 1967): synonym of Haurakia sinuastoma (Ponder, 1967)
- † Pusillina sodalis (Laws, 1939) : synonym of † Haurakia sodalis Laws, 1939
- Pusillina subsuturalis (Dell, 1956): synonym of Haurakia subsuturalis Dell, 1956
- Pusillina sufflava Cecalupo & Perugia, 2009: represented as Pusillina (Haurakia) sufflava Cecalupo & Perugia, 2009: synonym of Haurakia sufflava (Cecalupo & Perugia, 2009)
- † Pusillina tenuisculpta (Laws, 1950): synonym of † Haurakia tenuisculpta Laws, 1950
- Pusillina wallacei] (W. R. B. Oliver, 1915): synonym of Haurakia wallacei (Oliver, 1915)
