= 1970s energy crisis =

Global oil shortage due to geopolitics

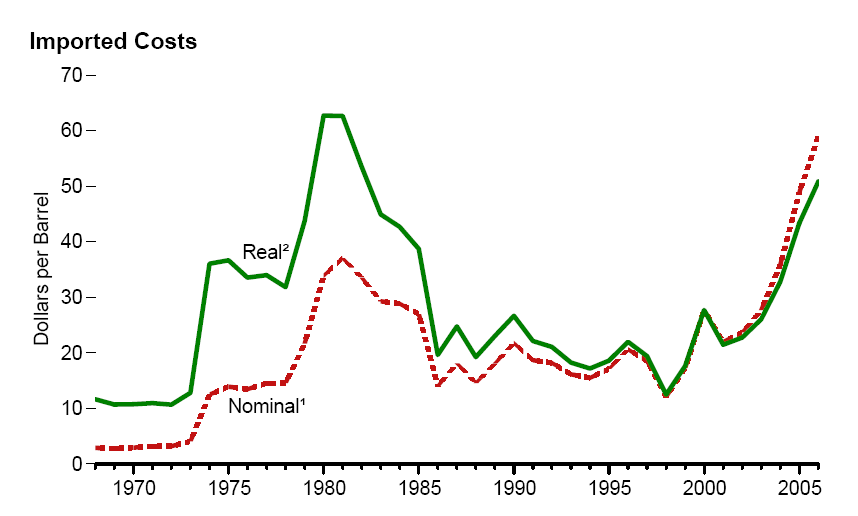
- Real and nominal price of oil, 1968–2006.
- Date: 1973–1980
- Also known as: 1970s oil crisis

The 1970s energy crisis occurred when the Western world, particularly the United States, Canada, Western Europe, Australia, and New Zealand, experienced substantial petroleum shortages as well as elevated prices. The two worst crises of this period were the 1973 oil crisis and the 1979 oil crisis, when, respectively, the Yom Kippur War and the Iranian Revolution triggered interruptions in Middle Eastern oil exports.

The crisis began to unfold as petroleum production in the United States and some other parts of the world peaked in the late 1960s and early 1970s. World oil production per capita began a long-term decline after 1979. The oil crises prompted the first shift towards energy-saving (in particular, fossil fuel-saving) technologies.

The major industrial centers of the world were forced to contend with escalating issues related to petroleum supply. Western countries relied on the resources of countries in the Middle East and other parts of the world. The crisis led to stagnant economic growth in many countries as oil prices surged. Although there were genuine concerns with supply, part of the run-up in prices resulted from the perception of a crisis. The combination of stagnant growth and price inflation during this era led to the coinage of the term stagflation. By the 1980s, both the recessions of the 1970s and adjustments in local economies to become more efficient in petroleum usage, controlled demand sufficiently for petroleum prices worldwide to return to more sustainable levels.

The period was not uniformly negative for all economies. Petroleum-rich countries in the Middle East benefited from increased prices and the slowing production in other areas of the world. Some other countries, such as Norway, Mexico, and Venezuela, benefited as well. In the United States, Texas and Alaska, as well as some other oil-producing areas, experienced major economic booms due to soaring oil prices even as most of the rest of the nation struggled with the stagnant economy. Many of these economic gains, however, came to a halt as prices stabilized and dropped in the 1980s.

== Key periods ==
=== Arab-Israeli conflict ===
Conflict between Arabs and Israelis in the Middle East has existed since Israel's declaration of independence in 1948, including a number of wars. The 1956 Suez Crisis, also known as the Second Arab–Israeli war, was sparked when Israel's southern port of Eilat was blocked by Egypt, which also nationalized the Suez Canal belonging to Anglo-French investors. One of the objectives of the Anglo-French-Israeli invasion was the removal of President Gamal Abdel Nasser who was aligning with the Soviet Union.

The Six-Day War of 1967 included an Israeli invasion of the Egyptian Sinai Peninsula, which resulted in Egypt's closure of the Suez Canal for eight years after Israel occupied the Sinai Peninsula. The canal was cleared in 1974 and opened again in 1975 after the 1973 Yom Kippur War, when Egypt tried and failed to take back the Sinai Peninsula. OAPEC countries cut production of oil and placed an embargo on oil exports to the United States after Richard Nixon requested $2.2 billion to support Israel in the war after learning that the Soviet Union, was aiding Syria and Egypt in the war. Nevertheless, the embargo lasted only until January 1974, though the price of oil remained high afterwards.

=== Production peaks around 1970 ===
United States oil production and imports, showing a production peak in 1970

The real price of petroleum was stable in the 1970 timeframe, but there had been a sharp increase in American imports, putting a strain on American balance of trade, alongside other developed nations. During the 1960s, petroleum production in some of the world's top producers with extraction technology at the time began to peak. West Germany reached its production peak in 1966, Venezuela and the United States in 1970, and Iran in 1974. Canada's conventional oil production peaked around the same time (though non-conventional production later helped revive Canadian production to some degree). The worldwide production per capita peaked soon afterward.

Although production in other parts of the world was increasing, the peaks in these regions began to put substantial upward pressure on world oil prices. Equally as important, control of the oil supply became an increasingly important problem as countries like West Germany and the U.S. became increasingly dependent on foreign suppliers for this key resource.

=== 1973 oil crisis ===
The 1973 oil crisis was a direct consequence of the U.S production peak in late 1960 and the beginning of 1971 (and shortages, especially for heating oil, started from there). The "embargo" as described below is the "practical name" given to the crisis. The main Arab producers claimed that the "embargo" was in support of Egypt in its bid to reclaim its territory in Sinai and Gaza. In reality, the main Arab producers wanted to punish the U.S for re-supplying Israel with weapons during the Yom Kippur War, in response to the Soviet Union re-supplying Syria and Egypt with weapons. The embargo had a minimal effect on oil imports as there were few embargoing countries, as well as few embargo targets.

The embargo was never effective from Saudi Arabia towards the US, as reported by James E. Akins in interview at 24:10 in the documentary "la face cachée du pétrole part 2". Akins, who audited US capacity for Nixon after US peak, was US ambassador in Saudi Arabia at that time. Lawrence Rocks and Richard Runyon captured the unfolding of these events at the time in The Energy Crisis book. In October 1973, the members of Organization of Arab Petroleum Exporting Countries or the OAPEC (consisting of the Arab members of OPEC) proclaimed an oil embargo "in response to the U.S. decision to re-supply the Israeli military" during the Yom Kippur war, after the Soviet Union re-supplied Egypt, and Syria; it lasted until March 1974. OAPEC declared it would limit or stop oil shipments to the United States and other countries if they supported Israel in the conflict. With the US actions seen as initiating the oil embargo, the long-term possibility of embargo-related high oil prices, disrupted supply and recession, created a strong rift within NATO; both European countries and Japan sought to disassociate themselves from the US Middle East policy. Arab oil producers had also linked the end of the embargo with successful US efforts to create peace in the Middle East, which complicated the situation. To address these developments, the Nixon Administration began parallel negotiations with both Arab oil producers to end the embargo, and with Egypt, Syria, and Israel to arrange an Israeli pull back from the Sinai and the Golan Heights after the fighting stopped. By January 18, 1974, Secretary of State Henry Kissinger had negotiated an Israeli troop withdrawal from parts of the Sinai. The promise of a negotiated settlement between Israel and Syria was sufficient to convince Arab oil producers to lift the embargo in March 1974. By May, Israel agreed to withdraw from parts of the Golan Heights close to the Syrian border.

Graph of oil prices from 1861 to 2007, showing a sharp increase in 1973, and again in 1979. The orange line is adjusted for inflation.

Independently, the OPEC members agreed to use their leverage over the world price-setting mechanism for oil to stabilize their real incomes by raising world oil prices. This action followed several years of steep income declines after the recent failure of negotiations with the major Western oil companies earlier in the month.

For the most part, industrialized economies relied on crude oil, and OPEC was a major supplier. Because of the dramatic inflation experienced during this period, a popular economic theory has been that these price increases were to blame, as being suppressive of economic activity. However, the causality stated by this theory is often questioned. The targeted countries responded with a wide variety of new, and mostly permanent, initiatives to contain their further dependency. The 1973 "oil price shock", along with the 1973–1974 stock market crash, have been regarded as the first event since the Great Depression to have a persistent economic effect.

=== 1979 energy crisis ===
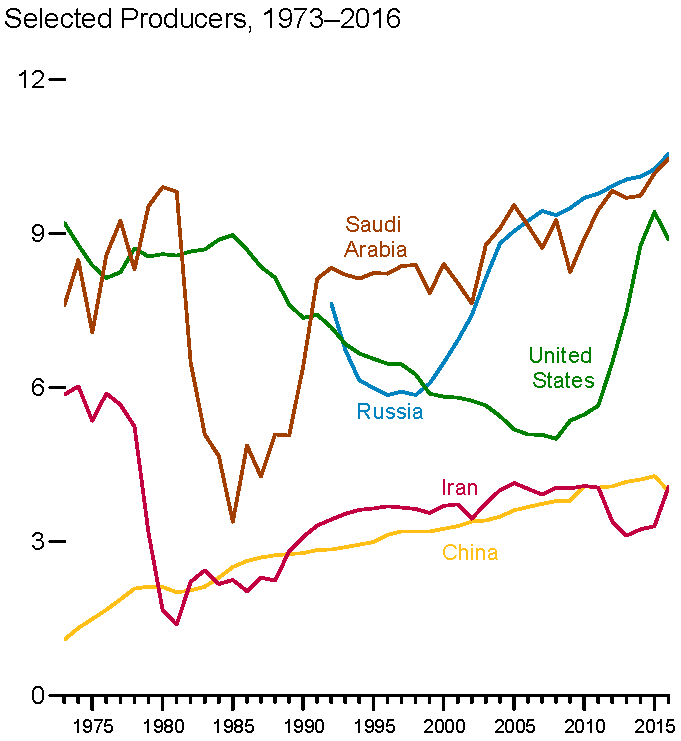
Production in top countries by year (million barrels per day)

A crisis emerged in the United States in 1979 during the wake of the Iranian Revolution. Amid massive protests, the Shah of Iran, Mohammad Reza Pahlavi, fled his country in early 1979, allowing the Ayatollah Khomeini to gain control. The protests shattered the Iranian oil sector. While the new regime resumed oil exports, it was inconsistent and at a lower volume, forcing prices to go up. Saudi Arabia and other OPEC nations, under the presidency of Dr. Mana Alotaiba increased production to offset the decline, and the overall loss in production was about 4 percent. However, a widespread panic resulted, driving the price far higher than would be expected under normal circumstances.

In 1980, following the Iraqi invasion of Iran, oil production in Iran nearly stopped, and Iraq's oil production was severely cut as well. Afterwards, oil prices began a decline as other countries began to fill the production shortfalls from Iran and Iraq.

=== 1980s oil glut ===
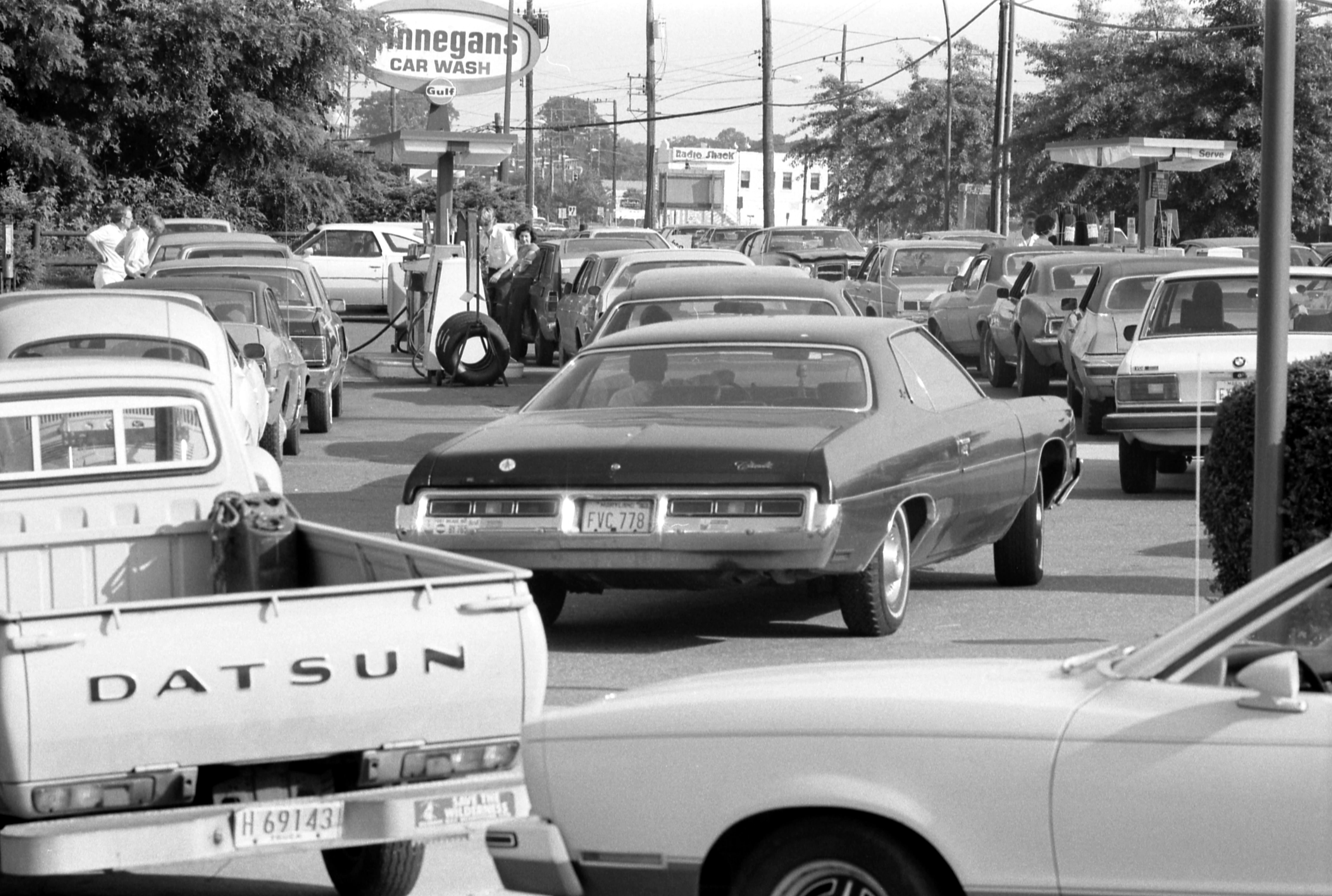
Cars line up for gas during the 1979 Oil Crisis

The 1973 and 1979 energy crisis had caused petroleum prices to peak in 1980 at over US$35 per barrel (equivalent to US$137 in 2025 dollars). Following these events slowing industrial economies and stabilization of supply and demand caused prices to begin falling in the 1980s. The glut began in the early 1980s as a result of slowed economic activity in industrial countries (due to the 1973 and 1979 energy crises) and the energy conservation spurred by high fuel prices. The inflation adjusted real 2021 dollar value of oil fell from an average of $105 per barrel in 1981 to an average of $36 in 1986.

In June 1981, The New York Times stated an "Oil glut! ... is here" and Time Magazine stated: "the world temporarily floats in a glut of oil", though the next week a New York Times article warned that the word "glut" was misleading, and that in reality, while temporary surpluses had brought down prices somewhat, prices were still well above pre-energy crisis levels. This sentiment was echoed in November 1981, when the CEO of Exxon also characterized the glut as a temporary surplus, and that the word "glut" was an example of "our American penchant for exaggerated language". He wrote that the main cause of the glut was declining consumption. In the United States, Europe and Japan, oil consumption had fallen 13% from 1979 to 1981, due to "in part, in reaction to the very large increases in oil prices by the Organization of Petroleum Exporting Countries and other oil exporters", continuing a trend begun during the 1973 price increases.

After 1980, reduced demand and overproduction produced a glut on the world market, causing a six-year-long decline in oil prices culminating with a 46 percent price drop in 1986.

== Effects ==
=== Recession ===
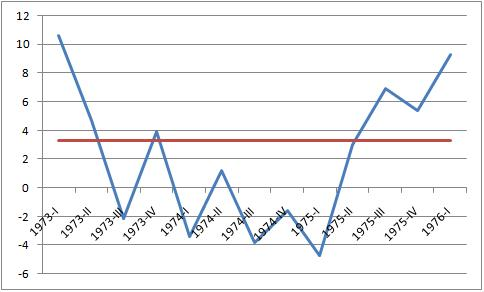
In the parlance of recession shapes, the Recession of 1973–75 in the United States could be considered a U-shaped recession, because of its prolonged period of weak growth and contraction. Percent change from preceding period in real gross domestic product (annualized; seasonally adjusted) Average GDP growth 1947–2009 Source: Bureau of Economic Analysis

The U.S. reported negative economic growth during the 1970s and remained weak till the 1980s as the post World War II economic boom drew to a close.

Other causes that contributed to the recession included the Vietnam War, which turned out costly for the United States and the fall of the Bretton Woods system. The emergence of newly industrialized countries rose competition in the metal industry, triggering a steel crisis, where industrial core areas in North America and Europe were forced to re-structure. The 1973–1974 stock market crash made the recession evident.

According to the National Bureau of Economic Research, the U.S. economy slid into a recession in 1973–75. Inflation levels remained high even when an economic expansion took place afterwards.

During this recession, the Gross Domestic Product of the United States fell 3.2%. Although the recession ended in March 1975, the unemployment rate did not peak for several months. In May 1975, the rate reached its height for the cycle of 9%.

The recession also lasted from 1973 to 1975 in the United Kingdom. The GDP declined by 3.9% or 3.37% depending on the source. It took 14 quarters for the UK's GDP to recover to that at the start of recession.

=== Emergence of new oil producers ===
High oil prices in the 1970s induced investment in oil production by non-OPEC countries, particularly for reserves with a higher cost of production. These included Prudhoe Bay in Alaska, the North Sea offshore fields of the United Kingdom and Norway, the Cantarell offshore field of Mexico, and oil sands in Canada.

=== Strategic petroleum reserves ===
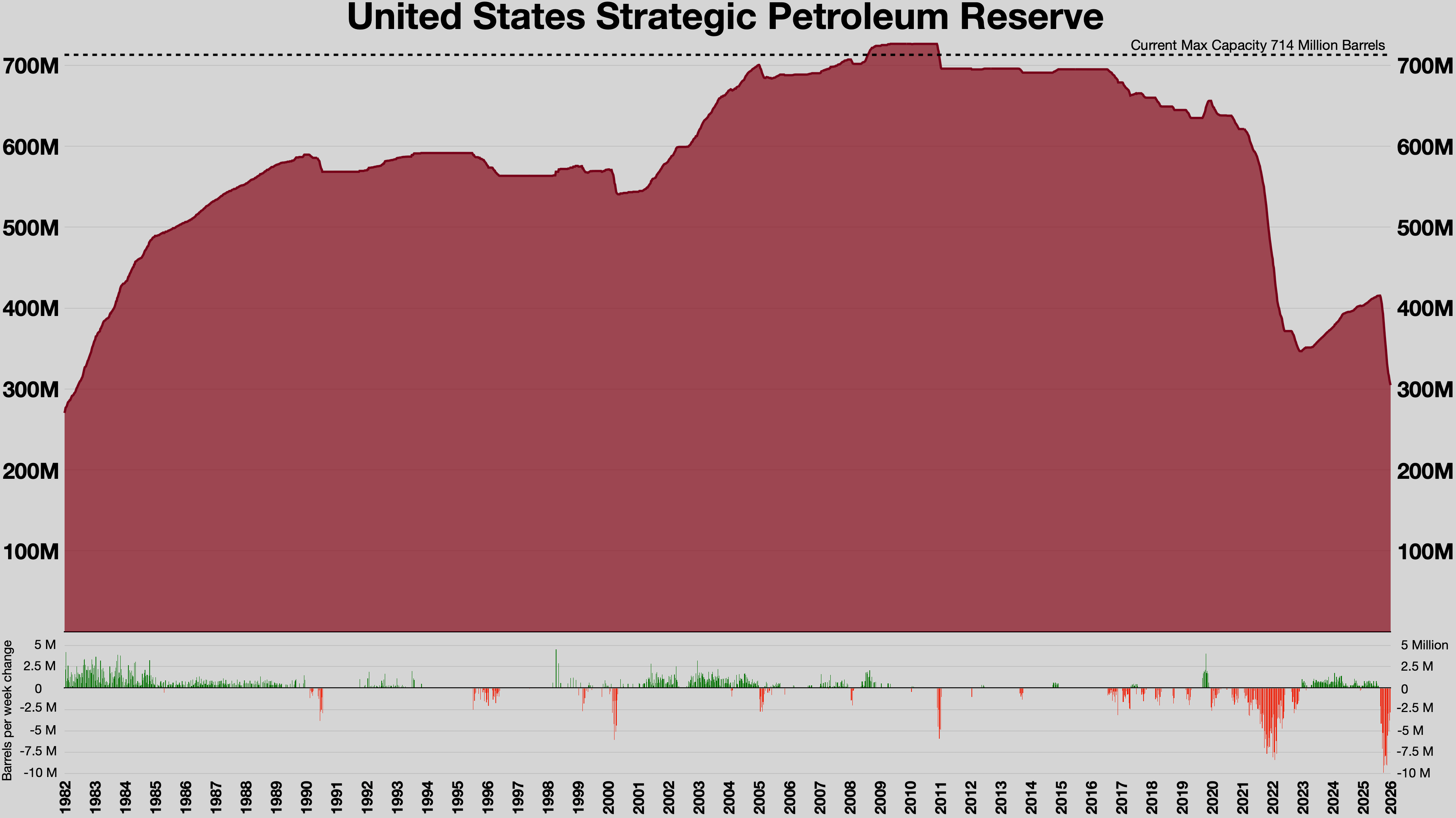
United States Strategic Petroleum Reserve Weekly data points since 1982 Barrels of oil

As a result of the 1973 crisis many nations created strategic petroleum reserves (SPRs), crude oil inventories (or stockpiles) held by the governments of particular countries or private industry, for the purpose of providing economic and national security during an energy crisis. The International Energy Agency (IEA) was formed in the wake of this crisis and currently comprises 31 member countries. According to the IEA, approximately 4.1 billion barrels (650,000,000 m^{3}) of oil are held in strategic reserves by the member countries, of which 1.4 billion barrels (220,000,000 m^{3}) is government-controlled. The remainder is held by private industry. These reserves are intended to be equivalent to at least 90 days of net imports. At the moment the U.S. Strategic Petroleum Reserve is one of the largest government-owned reserves, with a capacity of up to 713.5 million barrels (113,440,000 m^{3}).

Recently, other non-IEA countries have begun creating their own strategic petroleum reserves, with China being the second largest overall and the largest non-IEA country.

=== Middle East ===
Since Israel's declaration of independence in 1948 this state has found itself in nearly continual conflict with the Arab world and some other predominantly Muslim countries. The animosity between the Arabs and the Israelis became a global issue during the 1970s. The Yom Kippur War of 1973, with the supplying of Israel by its Western allies while some Arab states received Soviet supplies, made this one of the most internationally threatening confrontations of the period.

The large oil discoveries in the Middle East gave some Muslim countries unique leverage in the world, beginning in the 1960s. The 1973 and 1979 crises, in particular, were demonstrations of the new power that these countries had found. The United States and other countries were forced to become more involved in the conflicts between these states and Israel.

=== OPEC ===
One of the first challenges OPEC faced in the 1970s was the United States' unilaterally pulling out of the Bretton Woods Accord and taking the U.S. off the established Gold Exchange Standard in 1971. The change resulted in instability in world currencies and depreciation of the value of the U.S. dollar, as well as other currencies. The revenues of OPEC also took a hit since they priced oil in dollars.

Finally OPEC started pricing oil against gold to combat the situation. But OPEC still struggled to maintain stability in the region as the negotiations between them and other Western oil companies bore little to no positive results.

=== "Oil Patch" ===
The major oil-producing regions of the U.S.—Texas, Oklahoma, Louisiana, Colorado, Wyoming, and Alaska—benefited greatly from the price inflation of the 1970s as did the U.S. oil industry in general. Oil prices generally increased throughout the decade; between 1978 and 1980 the price of West Texas Intermediate crude oil increased 250 percent. Although all states felt the effects of the stock market crash and related national economic problems, the economic benefits of increased oil revenue in the Oil Patch states generally offset much of this.

== See also ==
- Energy crisis
- 1973–1975 recession
- 1970–1979 world oil market chronology
- 1980s oil glut
- 1990 oil price shock
- 2020s commodities boom
- 2026 Strait of Hormuz crisis
- 2026 Iran war fuel crisis
- Hubbert peak theory
- International Energy Forum
