= P. ehrenbergi =

P. ehrenbergi may refer to:

- Pachysentis ehrenbergi, a parasitic worm
- Pogonioefferia ehrenbergi, a robber fly
- Polycarpa ehrenbergi, a marine invertebrate
- Pusillina ehrenbergi, a sea snail

== See also ==
- P. ehrenbergii (disambiguation)
