= Pusillina amblia =

Scientific classification
- Kingdom: Animalia
- Phylum: Mollusca
- Class: Gastropoda
- Subclass: Caenogastropoda
- Order: Littorinimorpha
- Family: Rissoidae
- Genus: Pusillina
- Species: P. amblia

Binomial name
- Pusillina amblia (Watson, 1886)

Synonyms
- Rissoa amblia Watson, 1886

Species of gastropod

Pusillina amblia is a species of minute sea snail, a marine gastropod mollusk or micromollusk in the family Rissoidae.

== Distribution ==
This marine species occurs off the Canary Islands.
