= Yellow Fleet =

Ships trapped in the Suez Canal (1967–1975)

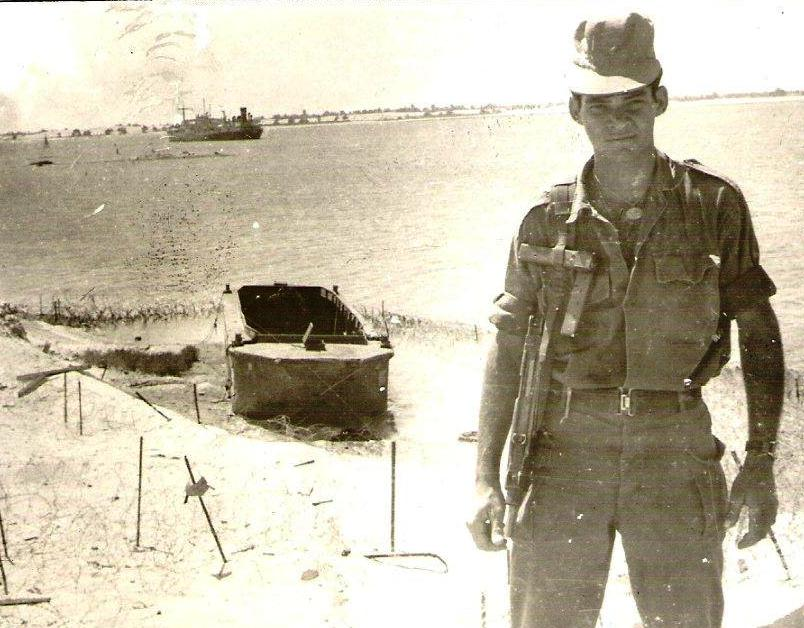
One of the trapped ships in 1973

From 1967 to 1975, 15 ships and their crews were trapped in the Suez Canal after the Six-Day War between Israel and Egypt. The stranded ships, which belonged to eight countries (West Germany, Sweden, France, the United Kingdom, the United States, Poland, Bulgaria, and Czechoslovakia), were nicknamed the Yellow Fleet after the desert sand that coated them.

During the war, Egypt blocked both ends of the canal to prevent its use by Israel. Scuttled ships, sea mines, and other debris continued to block transport through the canal until the wake of the Yom Kippur War, after which the blockade was lifted. In 1975, the Canal was reopened, enabling the ships to leave after eight years of being stranded. By that time only two ships were capable of moving under their own power.

== History ==
=== Closing of the canal ===
In June 1967, the 15 ships were sailing northward through the Suez Canal as a war broke out between Israel and Egypt in what was to become known as the Six-Day War. Both ends of the canal were closed, and after three days it became apparent that the canal would remain blocked for some time as a result of the scuttling of ships to block passage. Fourteen ships were forced to anchor in the widest part of the Suez Canal, the Great Bitter Lake. Some of the scuttled ships cut off the SS Observer from the other ships and it had to anchor in Lake Timsah.

Ships, dredgers, other floating craft and even a bridge were sunk to block the canal. In addition to the vessels that were sunk, there were a number of sea mines that prevented navigation. With the war having left the Israelis in possession of the entire east bank of the canal, the Egyptian President Gamal Abdel Nasser quickly resolved to keep the canal closed to all shipping indefinitely. The only alternative would have been to allow the Israelis to use it, which was anathema to the Egyptian government. Even if the political issues surrounding the canal could have somehow been resolved, its maintenance would have been economically nonviable since very few (if any) shippers would have been willing to send their vessels and crews through what was effectively a no man's land in an active combat zone.

Throughout the eight years, the Israeli and Egyptian armies faced off against each other on either side of the Suez Canal. Sometimes raiding parties from both sides would slip across the canal to gather intelligence. One of the main concerns was that the canal would become silted up without regular dredging. It turned out to be a non-issue: 90 percent of the canal's silt had been a result of currents caused by the turning of ships' propellers, which was virtually non-existent during this period.

=== Eight years of war ===
In October 1967, the officers and crews of all fourteen ships met on the Melampus to found the "Great Bitter Lake Association" which provided mutual support. Crew members continued to regularly meet on board their ships, organized social events, founded a yachting club and held the "Bitter Lake Olympic Games" to complement the 1968 Summer Olympics in Mexico City. Life boat races were arranged and soccer games were played on the largest ship, the MS Port Invercargill, while church services were held on the West German motorship Nordwind and movies were shown on the Bulgarian freighter Vasil Levsky. The Swedish Killara had a pool.

In time, it was possible to reduce the number of crew members on board the ships, and in 1969 the ships were gathered into several groups to further reduce the number of crew necessary for their upkeep. Those crew that were left to maintain the vessels were rotated every three months. In 1972, the last crew members of the German ships were finally sent home, with the maintenance of the ships left to a Norwegian company.

A postal system evolved, the hand-crafted postage stamps of which became collectors' items around the world. The Egyptian postal authority recognized the stamps, allowing their use worldwide.

=== Re-opening of the canal ===
In early 1975, the Suez Canal was once again opened for international transport, and on 24 May 1975, the German ships Münsterland and Nordwind finally reached Hamburg port, cheered by more than 30,000 spectators. They were reportedly the only ships to have returned to their home port under their own power. For the Münsterland, this was the end of a voyage to Australia which had lasted eight years, three months, and five days.

=== Legacy ===
In the 2010s, there was renewed interest in this incident. Two books have been published that chronicle the eight-year sojourn of the ships in the Great Bitter Lake, Acht Jahre gefangen im Großen Bittersee (in German) by Hans Jürgen Witthöft (2015), and Stranded in the Six-Day War (in English) by Cath Senker (2017).

== Stranded ships ==
Name	Nationality	Owner	Captain	Cargo	Gross tonnage	References
MS Nordwind	West Germany	Nordstern Reederei	Gerhard Lomer	T-shirts	8,656	
MS Münsterland	West Germany	Hamburg America Line	Karl Hoffmann, replaced by Jürgen Katzler, Wolfgang Scharrnbeck	Eggs, fruit	9,365	
MS Killara	Sweden	Rederiaktiebolaget Transatlantic	Sture Sundnér	Wool, hides, fruit, lead, pigs from Australia	12,990	
MS Nippon	Sweden	Svenska Ostasiatiska Kompaniet	Arthur Bjuréus, Ulf Bergman	Case goods from Far East	10,660	
MS Essayons (Note: ex Sindh)	France				7,051	
MS Agapenor	United Kingdom	Blue Funnel Line		Plastic toys for Woolworths	7,654	
MS Melampus	United Kingdom	Blue Funnel Line	Jim Starkey		8,509	
MS Scottish Star	United Kingdom	Blue Star Line	Brian McManus		10,174	
MS Port Invercargill	United Kingdom	Port Line	Arthur Kensett		10,463	
SS African Glen (Note: Sunk in 1973 during the Yom Kippur War)	United States	Farrell Lines			6,116	
MS Djakarta	Poland	Polish Ocean Lines			6,915	
MS Boleslaw Bierut	Poland	Polish Ocean Lines	Bogdan Kryspin		6,674	
MS Vasil Levsky	Bulgaria	Navigation Maritime			4,975	
MS Lednice	Czechoslovakia	Československá plavba dunajská (Czechoslovak Danube Shipping)	Klement Benda, Ladislav Šlechta	Raw cowhides from Ethiopia	1,462	
SS Observer (Note: Was stranded in Lake Timsah)	United States	Marine Carriers Corp.	Charles Kapelowitz	Wheat (Galveston to Bombay)	17,614	

Table notes

== See also ==
- Closure of the Suez Canal (1967-1975)
- 1974 Suez Canal Clearance Operation
- 2021 Suez Canal obstruction
