= Pusillina lineolata =

Scientific classification
- Kingdom: Animalia
- Phylum: Mollusca
- Class: Gastropoda
- Subclass: Caenogastropoda
- Order: Littorinimorpha
- Family: Rissoidae
- Genus: Pusillina
- Species: P. lineolata

Binomial name
- Pusillina lineolata (Michaud, 1832)

Synonyms
- Rissoa lineolata Michaud, 1830<

Species of gastropod

Pusillina lineolata is a species of small sea snail, a marine gastropod mollusk or micromollusk in the family Rissoidae.
