= Pusillina testudae =

Scientific classification
- Kingdom: Animalia
- Phylum: Mollusca
- Class: Gastropoda
- Subclass: Caenogastropoda
- Order: Littorinimorpha
- Family: Rissoidae
- Genus: Pusillina
- Species: P. testudae

Binomial name
- Pusillina testudae (Verduin, 1979)

Synonyms
- Rissoa testudae Verduin, 1979

Species of gastropod

Pusillina testudae is a species of small sea snail, a marine gastropod mollusk or micromollusk in the family Rissoidae.

== Distribution ==
This marine species occurs in the Strait of Gibraltar.
