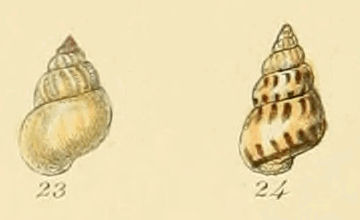

Scientific classification
- Kingdom: Animalia
- Phylum: Mollusca
- Class: Gastropoda
- Subclass: Caenogastropoda
- Order: Littorinimorpha
- Family: Rissoidae
- Genus: Pusillina
- Species: P. inconspicua

Binomial name
- Pusillina inconspicua (Alder, 1844)

Synonyms
- Pusillina diversa (F. Nordsieck, 1972); Rissoa inconspicua Alder, 1844; Rissoa inconspicua var. ventrosa Jeffreys, 1867; Sabanea apicina Monterosato, 1890; Sabanea prismatica Monterosato, 1890; Turboella densa Nordsieck, 1972; Turboella diversa Nordsieck, 1972; Turboella diversa diversiella Nordsieck, 1972; Turboella inconspicua (Alder, 1844); Turboella inconspicua distans Nordsieck, 1972

= Pusillina inconspicua =

Species of gastropod

Pusillina inconspicua is a species of small sea snail, a marine gastropod mollusk or micromollusk in the family Rissoidae.
