= 1974 Suez Canal Clearance Operation =

Agreement to reopen the Suez Canal following the Yom Kippur War

Operations Nimbus Star/Nimbus Moon/Nimrod Spar
- Part of the Cold War and Arab–Israeli conflict
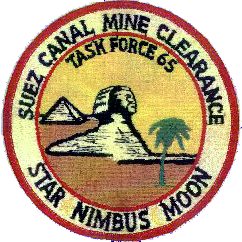
Date	1974–1975
Location	Suez Canal, Egypt 30°24′44.71″N 32°21′30.03″E

Following the Yom Kippur War between Egypt and Israel in 1973, an international agreement was reached in October 1973 to provide measures to reopen the Suez Canal after its closure for 8 years after the 1967 Six-Day War. The U.S.-led clearing effort undertaken in 1974 consisted of three operations: the sweeping of mines in the Suez Canal by naval units from the United States, the United Kingdom, and France (Operation Nimbus Star); the provision of training and advisory assistance for land and water explosive ordnance clearance for Egyptian forces (Operation Nimbus Moon); and the removal and salvage of wrecks from the Canal (Operation Nimrod Spar).

== Operation Nimbus Star ==
Operation Nimbus Star involved the clearance of naval mines and unexploded ordnance from portions of the Suez Canal and its approaches The U.S. Navy amphibious assault ship USS Iwo Jima (LPH-2) (later relieved by USS Inchon (LPH-12)) deployed more than a month early with only five days notice, and became the flagship of "Task Force 65" to clear mines from the Suez Canal. On board, Helicopter Mine Countermeasures Squadron 12 (HM-12), flying RH-53D Sea Stallion helicopters and towing Mk 105 hydrofoil sleds, performed the minesweeping operation. A detachment from Marine Medium Helicopter Squadron HMM-261, flying CH-46 Sea Knight helicopters, provided airborne search and rescue stand-by support. The main body of HMM-261 had been off-loaded at Sigonella, Sicily prior to departure for Egypt.

One of the first steps to reopen the canal was taken on 22 April 1974, when a U.S. Navy RH-53D Sea Stallion helicopter of HM-12 took off from Iwo Jima, which was anchored off the northern end of the canal, picked up a Mark-105 magnetic minesweeping sled from the U.S. support teams ashore, and began sweeping the approaches to Port Said harbor. For the next six weeks, U.S. Navy helicopters gradually worked their way down the canal, pulling the sleds through each area of the canal waters a number of times, to ensure the absence of any live magnetic ordnance. When this first phase of the operations, known as "Nimbus Star", was finished on 3 June 1974, Sea Stallions from HM-12 and the minesweeping support crews from the Mobile Mine Countermeasures Command at Charleston, South Carolina, had swept a total of 7600 linear miles in about 500 hours of on-station time. An area of 310 square kilometers was swept in 43 days.

== Operation Nimbus Moon ==
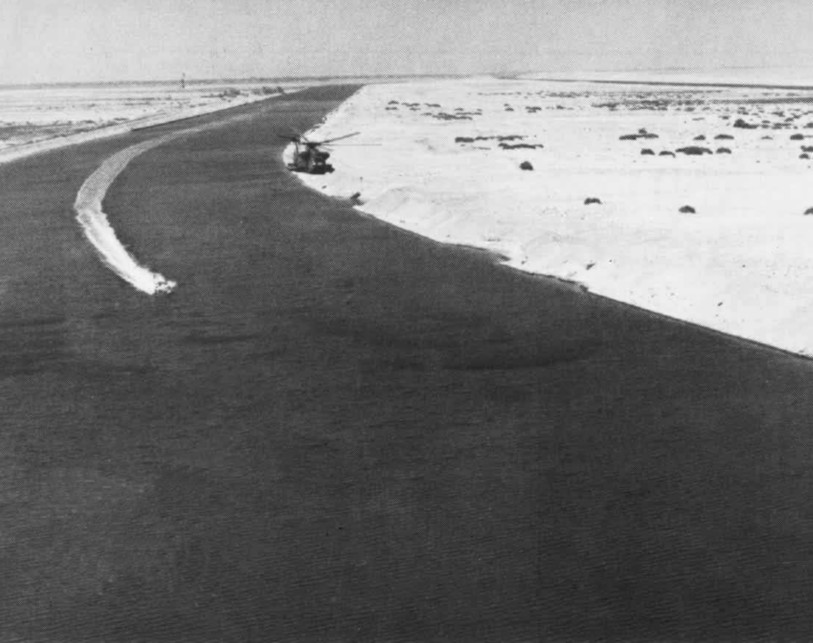
RH-53D sweeping Suez Canal 1974

Nearly 1,700 Egyptian Army engineers received training by U.S. Army Explosive Ordnance Disposal (EOD) including personnel of the 43rd Ordnance Detachment (now the 703rd Ordnance Company) and engineering personnel in the tools and techniques of American land mine clearance. The Egyptian Army’s job was to sweep along the banks of the canal’s entire length, out to a distance of 250 meters. They were to find and disarm or destroy any land mines, or other unexploded ordnance left from previous wars. In July 1974, they announced that they had found a total of 686,000 land mines, both anti-tank and anti-personnel, in the area. They also reported finding 13,500 other pieces of unexploded ordnance. The U.S. Army land ordnance clearing advisory effort was known as "Operation Nimbus Moon".

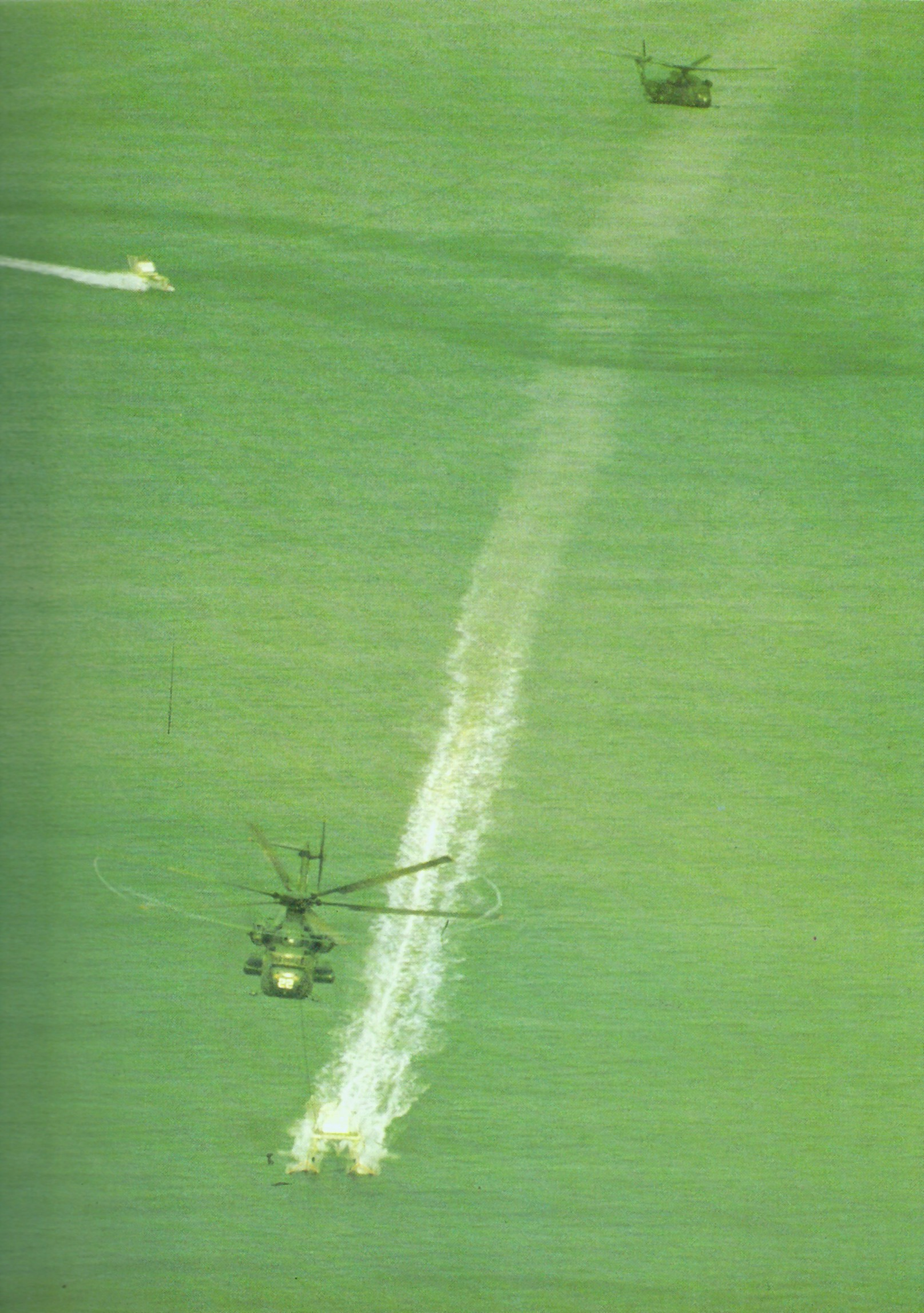
US Navy RH-53Ds sweeping the Suez Canal in 1974.

=== Operation Nimbus Moon (Water) ===
Operation Moon Water was the clearance of ordnance from the Suez Canal bed as part of Operation Nimbus Moon. The operation ran until the end of 1974 and, at a much-reduced rate, into 1975, being completed by the end of July 1975. U.S. Navy EOD divers, who were prohibited from actual ordnance operations, provided both diving and explosives training to Egyptian Navy personnel and accompanied them in the diving boats, serving as on-scene advisors. A Suez Canal Authority pilot boat with an American sonar device installed searched the canal from bank to bank providing highly accurate charts of the canal bed. These charts were used by the diving advisors, who directed the Egyptians to investigate likely ordnance contacts. The ordnance that was discovered was usually destroyed in place with explosive charges. Non-ordnance items, such as oil drums or tanks, were marked for later removal by Egyptian police divers because the canal was slated for future dredging, all large pieces of refuse had to be removed. The American-Egyptian team completed one full sweep of the canal bottom in late November 1974.

British and French EOD divers were also conducting their own searches. Through double-sweeping and, at times, triple-sweeping various areas, more complete coverage could be obtained. Each group found items missed by previous divers. The Royal Navy used three mine-hunting ships, with their high-resolution sonar equipment, and an independent diving group known as the Fleet Clearance Diving Team. The French Navy used both mine-hunting ships in an active role and minesweepers as support ships.

When the search operations covered by Moon Water were finished in December 1974, a large amount of ordnance had been discovered:

- Approximately 7,500 unexploded ordnance items were found within the canal proper. They included about 375 rockets, 450 anti-tank mines, 600 projectiles, 825 mortars, 825 anti-personnel mines, a small number of bombs and over 1,100 bomblets, plus miscellaneous items such as grenades, scare charges, demolition charges, unit lots of small ammunition, and one 200 pound (90 kg) German air dropped mine from World War II.
- More than 1,000 unexploded ordnance items were found in harbors, basins, and anchorages outside of the canal. They consisted of a large number of miscellaneous items and, in smaller numbers, anti-tank mines, anti-personnel mines, rockets, mortars, projectiles (75 mm) and bomblets.
- Approximately 700 non-ordnance items were found, including 392 items inside the canal proper and 296 items in harbor basins and anchorages. 118 pontoon bridge sections, 102 boats and barges, and numerous large anchors, oil drums, trucks, tanks, aircraft wreckage, and other vehicles were among the items found.

== Operation Nimrod Spar ==
The final stage of the operation was "Nimrod Spar", removing ten designated wrecks from the canal channel. This salvage operation was undertaken by the Murphy Pacific Marine Salvage Company under the direct supervision of the U.S. Navy Supervisor of Salvage, John H. Boyd Jr. Work commenced on 29 May as teams of divers began to cut away the superstructure of the SS Mecca, the largest of the wrecks, a 6,700-ton Arab shipwreck blocking the channel. Additional salvage assets including two large heavy cranes and two heavy-lift craft were brought to the canal zone. The survey, trim and rigging, and lift operations were conducted simultaneously at multiple locations along the canal. The German heavy cranes Thor and Roland were employed first in the northern reaches of the canal to remove sections of the Mecca and Ismailia, and then near the southern terminus of the canal to clear the Dredge 22, tug Barren and tanker Magd. They then proceeded to the northern end of the Great Bitter Lake to salvage the dredge 15 September, the only wreck slated for reuse. The heavy-lift craft Crandell and Crilly were employed to lift and remove the four wrecks from the central region of the canal: Dredge 23, tug Mongued, dredge Kasser and a concrete caisson. All salvage operations were completed by 19 December 1974.

== See also ==
- Yellow Fleet
