= Great Bitter Lake =

Saltwater lake that is part of the Suez Canal in Egypt

- البحيرة المرة الكبرى (Arabic)
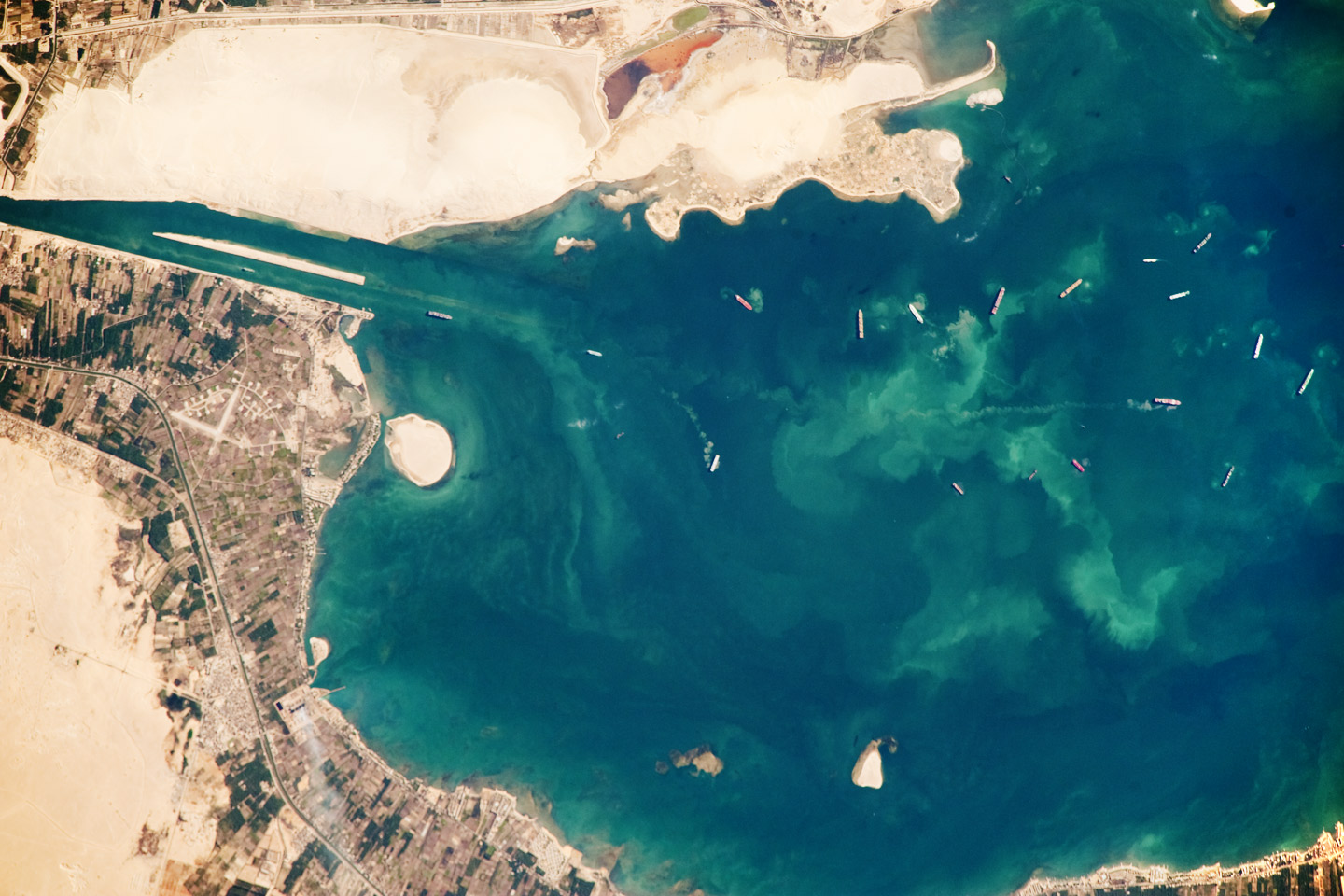
- The Great Bitter Lake from low orbit (north is left)

- Location within Egypt
- Location: Suez Canal
- Coordinates: 30°19′21″N 32°22′57″E
- Lake type: Salt lake
- Primary inflows: Suez Canal
- Primary outflows: Suez Canal
- Basin countries: Egypt
- First flooded: 1869
- Max. length: 24 km (15 mi)
- Max. width: 13 km (8.1 mi)
- Surface area: 194 km^{2} (75 mi^{2})
- Average depth: 18 m (59 ft)
- Max. depth: 28 m (92 ft)
- Salinity: 4.1%
- Surface elevation: 0 m (0 ft)
- Settlements: Fayed; Abou Sultan

The Great Bitter Lake (Arabic: البحيرة المرة الكبرى; transliterated: al-Buḥayrah al-Murra al-Kubrā) is a large saltwater lake in Egypt which is part of the Suez Canal. Before the canal was built in 1869, the Great Bitter Lake was a dry salt valley or basin. References are made to the Great Bitter Lake in the ancient Pyramid Texts.

The canal connects the Great Bitter Lake to the Mediterranean Sea and the Red Sea. The canal also connects it to the Small Bitter Lake (Arabic: البحيرة المرة الصغرى; transliterated: al-Buhayrah al-Murra as-Sughra).

Ships traveling through the Suez Canal use the Great Bitter Lake as a "passing lane", where they can pass other ships or turn around.

== Etymology ==
The Modern English and Arabic names are translations of the Greek name (Ancient Greek: Πικραὶ Λίμναι, lit. 'bitter lakes'). It was also known in Latin as "dead lake" (Latin: Lacus mori). The ancient Egyptian name for the Bitter Lakes region was km-wr, lit. "great black one".

== Salinity ==
The salinity of the lake varies along its depth and is greatest at the bottom where the water is in contact with the preexisting salt deposit, which has been consistently diminishing due to dissolution—thereby steadily increasing the depth of the lake—since the canal started operation in 1869.

Salinity is subject to seasonal variation as a result of yearly evaporation cycles. In the early 20th century, the minimum and maximum values were measured as 4.5% and 5.4%, respectively, with an average salinity of 4.9% (i.e. 49 g of salt per kg of lake water).

When the Suez Canal was closed for eight years, beginning during the Six-Day War in 1967, the salinity of the lake increased substantially. In 2017 the minimum and maximum values measured at 4.1% and 4.5%, with an average close to 4.1%. For comparison, seawater averages 3.5%, while the Dead Sea is around 34%.

The salinity of the lake also depends on how much seawater flows into it from the Red and the Mediterranean Seas. Even when the canal is open, in certain places the Great Bitter Lake can have a salinity level "more than twice" the level of the sea. While this makes it difficult for plant life to exist there, many species (of crabs, for example) migrate from the Red Sea through the area.

As the canal has no locks, seawater flows freely into the lake from the Mediterranean and the Red Sea. In general, north of the lakes, the current reverses seasonally, being north-going in winter and south-going in summer. South of the lakes, the current is tidal, reversing with the tides in the Red Sea. Fish and crabs can migrate, generally in a northerly direction, through the canal and lakes in what is known as a Lessepsian migration, as some Red Sea species have come to colonize the eastern Mediterranean.

== Molluscan species ==
=== Description and brief history ===
Following the opening of the Suez Canal in 1869, the area has witnessed massive marine migrations from the Red Sea, through the canal and into the Mediterranean. Anti-Lessepsian migrations, species migrating from the Mediterranean Sea to the Red Sea, were rare. The first recorded molluscan anti-Lessepsian migrant was Cerastoderma glaucum by Fisher (1870).

The hypersaline state of the water in the lake was found to make faunal and floral growth impossible there. Nevertheless, some seaweed was found on the eastern side of the lake, giving a slight hope of prolific biotope.

In 1998, Hoenselaar and Dekker studied the material collected in 1950 by Beets (1953), in which they discovered a total of 44 gastropods and 47 bivalve species in the lake. Of these species, they concluded that only three gastropods and five bivalves were of Mediterranean origin. The rest were all originally from the Red Sea. This imbalance of origin is due to the water currents, which mainly flow toward the Mediterranean Sea, generally hampering migration from the Mediterranean Sea toward the Red Sea. Still, in the years since 1950, more molluscan populations likely have migrated.

=== Gastropods and bivalves of the Great Bitter Lake ===
Thirty-one gastropods (table 1) and 19 bivalve species (table 2) are documented in the lake. The gastropods Pusillina radiata and Cyclope neritea, and the bivalves Cerastoderma glauca and Tapes decussatus are the only anti-Lessepsian species that are originally from the Mediterranean Sea.

Between spring 2016 and winter 2017, 41 different species of four phyla were found, among which were 12 molluscan species. Of all phyla, molluscs recorded the highest density, with a record of 90,632 individuals per m^{2}, due to the dominant presence of Modiolus oriculatus (75,052 individuals per m^{2} annually).

=== Molluscs and heavy metals ===
The Great Bitter Lake’s bottom soil is mainly composed of mud and sand (mostly carbonate), which can be related to the extensive and continuous drilling activities happening in the Suez Canal for its expansion. The soil is bleak due to the stagnant nature of the lake combined with the accumulation of pollutants coming from the naval traffic that occurs inside the lake. The motionless state of the lake, though, transforms the lake sediments into a depository of heavy metals. Several factors determine the availability of heavy metals at the bottom of the lake. In the recent years, a major part of heavy-metal pollution has originated from overpopulation, industrialization, sewage, dumpsites, crude-oil spills, agricultural chemicals, and more. Once these heavy metals integrate with the sediments composing the lake's soil, they serve as a guide to local pollution, answering the questions of where, how, and when did the polluting event occur. Heavy metals are spread out heterogeneously over the lake’s area. The different concentrations of these metals were in 11 areas of the lake; six were onshore at 2–3 m deep, and five were offshore at a depth of 12–15 m.

Molluscs are bioindicators of heavy-metal pollution in an aquatic body due to their ability to absorb heavy metals. The distribution of heavy metals is widespread all over the lake at different depths in both water and sediments. Each station records a certain level for the heavy metals available in its periphery. Each type of chemical reaches its highest (or lowest) concentration somewhere in the lake and each at different spots. On one side, the distribution shows that the pollution is not only concentrated in one area of the lake, but also that it is vastly spread out; on the other side, it shows that molluscan species inside the lake are not all exposed to the same quantity nor type of heavy metals. Consequently, molluscan species accumulate different types of heavy metals depending on their location in the lake, which can be used to estimate the various toxicity rates in the water of the lake.

== Quincy agreement ==
On 14 February 1945, Great Bitter Lake was the site of the Quincy agreement. U.S. President Franklin D. Roosevelt, having flown directly from the Yalta Conference, met on board the heavy cruiser USS Quincy with Saudi Arabia's King Abdulaziz Ibn Saud. President Roosevelt's interpreter was U.S. Marine Corps Colonel Bill Eddy, who recorded the men's conversation in his book FDR Meets Ibn Saud. The meeting is the subject of a BBC documentary by Adam Curtis, entitled Bitter Lake (2015).

== Yellow Fleet ==
During the Six-Day War in 1967, the canal was closed. Egypt kept it closed until 1975, trapping 15 ships in the lake. These ships became known as the "Yellow Fleet", because of the desert sands that soon covered their decks. The crews of the ships eventually organized, shared resources, and later set up their own post office and stamp. Two German-flagged ships eventually sailed out of the canal on their own power. Stranded cargo included various perishables (such as eggs and fruit), T-shirts, and a load of toys destined for Woolworth's.
