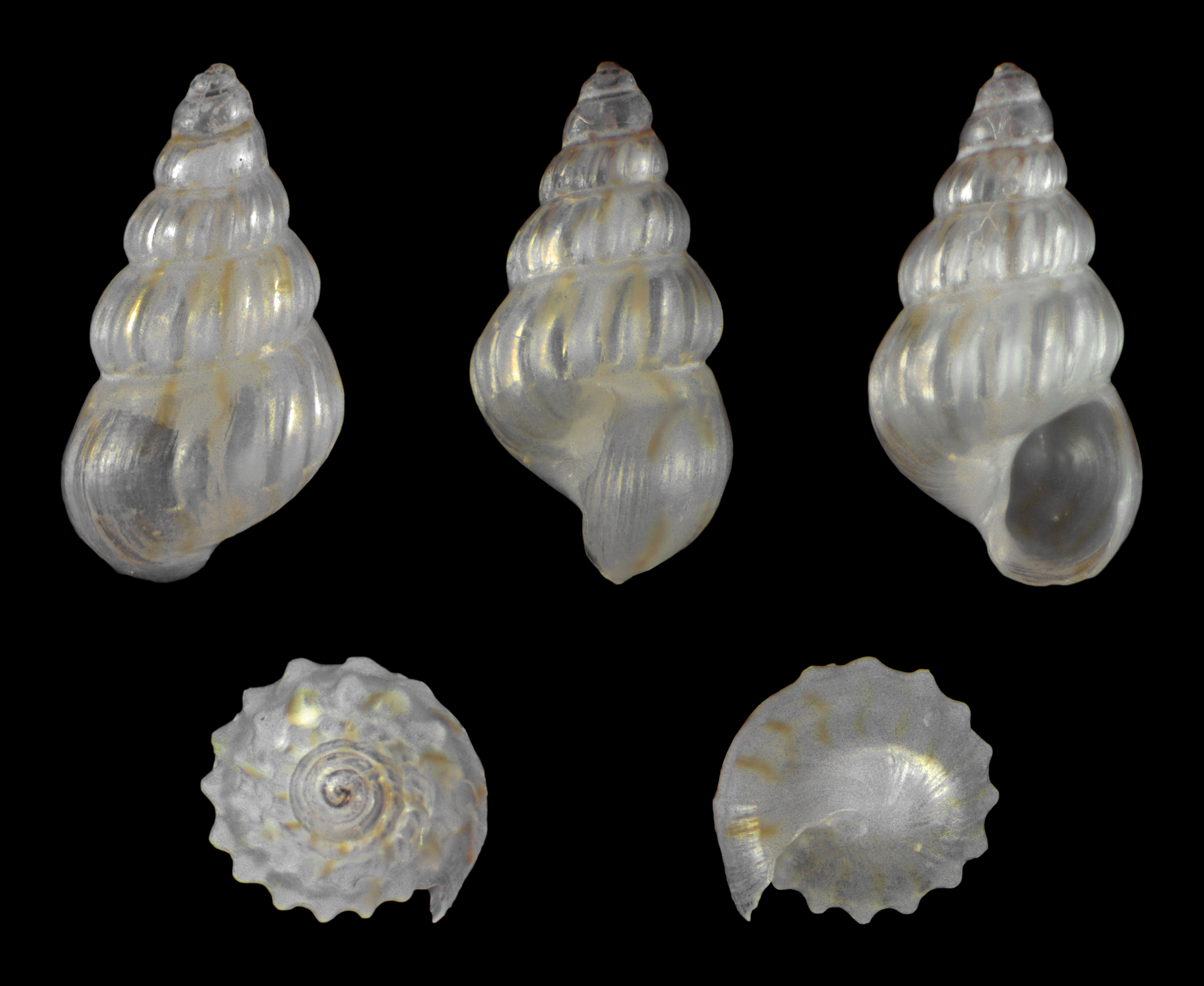

Scientific classification
- Kingdom: Animalia
- Phylum: Mollusca
- Class: Gastropoda
- Subclass: Caenogastropoda
- Order: Littorinimorpha
- Family: Rissoidae
- Genus: Pusillina
- Species: P. philippi

Binomial name
- Pusillina philippi (Aradas & Maggiore, 1844)

Synonyms
- Rissoa dolium Nyst, 1845

= Pusillina philippi =

Species of gastropod

Pusillina philippi is a species of minute sea snail, a marine gastropod mollusk or micromollusk in the family Rissoidae.

== Distribution ==
This marine species is found in the following locations:

- European waters (Spain, Portugal)
- Mediterranean Sea: Greece, Apulia.
