= Pusillina harpa =

Scientific classification
- Kingdom: Animalia
- Phylum: Mollusca
- Class: Gastropoda
- Subclass: Caenogastropoda
- Order: Littorinimorpha
- Family: Rissoidae
- Genus: Pusillina
- Species: P. harpa

Binomial name
- Pusillina harpa (A. E. Verrill, 1880)

Synonyms
- Alvania harpa (A. E. Verrill, 1880)

Species of gastropod

Pusillina harpa is a species of minute sea snail, a marine gastropod mollusk or micromollusk in the family Rissoidae.

== Description ==
The maximum recorded shell length is 2.8 mm.

== Habitat ==
Minimum recorded depth is 293 m. Maximum recorded depth is 891 m.
