= Pusillina minialba =

Scientific classification
- Kingdom: Animalia
- Phylum: Mollusca
- Class: Gastropoda
- Subclass: Caenogastropoda
- Order: Littorinimorpha
- Family: Rissoidae
- Genus: Pusillina
- Species: P. minialba

Binomial name
- Pusillina minialba Segers, Swinnen & De Prins, 2009

Species of gastropod

Pusillina minialba is a species of minute sea snail, a marine gastropod mollusk or micromollusk in the family Rissoidae.
