= Pusillina fuscapex =

Scientific classification
- Kingdom: Animalia
- Phylum: Mollusca
- Class: Gastropoda
- Subclass: Caenogastropoda
- Order: Littorinimorpha
- Family: Rissoidae
- Genus: Pusillina
- Species: P. fuscapex

Binomial name
- Pusillina fuscapex Gofas, 2007

Species of gastropod

Pusillina fuscapex is a species of minute sea snail, a marine gastropod mollusk or micromollusk in the family Rissoidae.
