= MV Magd =

British tanker ship

History
- Name: Empire Gain (1943–46); Barbatia (1946–57); Magd (1957–75)
- Owner: Ministry of War Transport (1943–45); Ministry of Transport (1945–46); Anglo-Saxon Petroleum Co. Ltd. (1946–55); Shell Tankers Ltd. (1955–57); Egyptian General Petroleum Organisation (1957–61); United Arab Maritime Co. (1961–67)
- Operator: Hadley Shipping Co. Ltd. (1943–46); Anglo-Saxon Petroleum Co. Ltd. (1946–55); Shell Petroleum Co. Ltd (1955–57); Egyptian General Petroleum Organisation (1957–61); United Arab Maritime Co. (1961–67)
- Port of registry: Sunderland, United Kingdom (1943-46); London, United Kingdom (1946–57); Alexandria, Egypt (1957-58); Alexandria, United Arab Republic (1958-67)
- Builder: Sir J. Laing & Sons Ltd
- Launched: 17 June 1943
- Completed: September 1943
- Out of service: 8 June 1967
- Identification: Code Letters GBYV (1943–57); United Kingdom Official Number 169121 (1943-57); Code Letters SUBM (1957–67)
- Fate: Attacked and sunk by Israeli aircraft

General characteristics
- Class & type: Tanker
- Tonnage: 3,738 gross register tons (GRT); 3,077 net register tons (NRT); 2,000 tons deadweight (DWT)
- Length: 357 ft 6 in (108.97 m) overall, 343 ft 5 in (104.67 m) between perpendiculars
- Beam: 48 ft 3 in (14.71 m)
- Draught: 26 ft 9 in (8.15 m)
- Depth: 26 ft 5 in (8.05 m)
- Installed power: Two diesel engines, 516 nhp each.

Magd was a tanker that was built by Sir J. Laing & Sons in 1943 as Empire Gain for the Ministry of War Transport. She was sold to the Anglo-Saxon Petroleum Co. Ltd. in 1946 and renamed Barbatia. Sold to Shell Tankers Ltd in 1955, she was seized by Egypt in November 1956 during the Suez Crisis. Allocated to the Egyptian General Petroleum Organisation in 1956, she was renamed Magd. In 1961, she was allocated to the United Arab Maritime Co. Magd was attacked and sunk by Israeli aircraft on 8 June 1967 during the Six-Day War. Her wreck was cleared in 1975.

== Description ==
The ship was 357 feet 6 inches (108.97 m) long overall (343 feet 5 inches (104.67 m) between perpendiculars) with a beam of 48 feet 3 inches (14.71 m). She had a depth of 26 feet 9 inches (8.15 m) and a draught of 26 feet 5 inches (8.05 m).

She was powered by two two-stroke single acting diesel engines. Each had three cylinders of 23 5/8 inches (60 cm) diameter by 91 5/16 inches (232 cm) stroke and was rated at 516nhp. The engines were built by William Doxford & Sons, Sunderland.

She was assessed at 3,738 GRT, 3,077 NRT, 2,000 DWT.

== History ==
Empire Gain was a tanker built by Sir J. Laing & Sons Ltd, Sunderland. For the Ministry of War Transport. She was launched on 17 June 1943 and completed in September. She was operated under the management of the Hadley Shipping Co. Ltd. Her port of registry was Sunderland. The Code Letters GBYV and United Kingdom Official Number 169121 were allocated.

In 1946, Empire Gain was sold to the Anglo-Saxon Petroleum Co. Ltd. and was renamed Barbita. She was sold to Shell Tankers Ltd. in 1955, and was operated under the management of Shell Petroleum Co. Ltd. In November 1956, Barbita was seized by Egypt during the Suez Crisis.

In 1957, Barbita was allocated to the Egyptian General Petroleum Organisation and was renamed Magd. The Code Letters SUBM were allocated. She was allocated to the United Arab Maritime Co. in 1961. She was attacked and sunk at the southern end of the Suez Canal by Israeli aircraft on 8 June, during the Six-Day War.

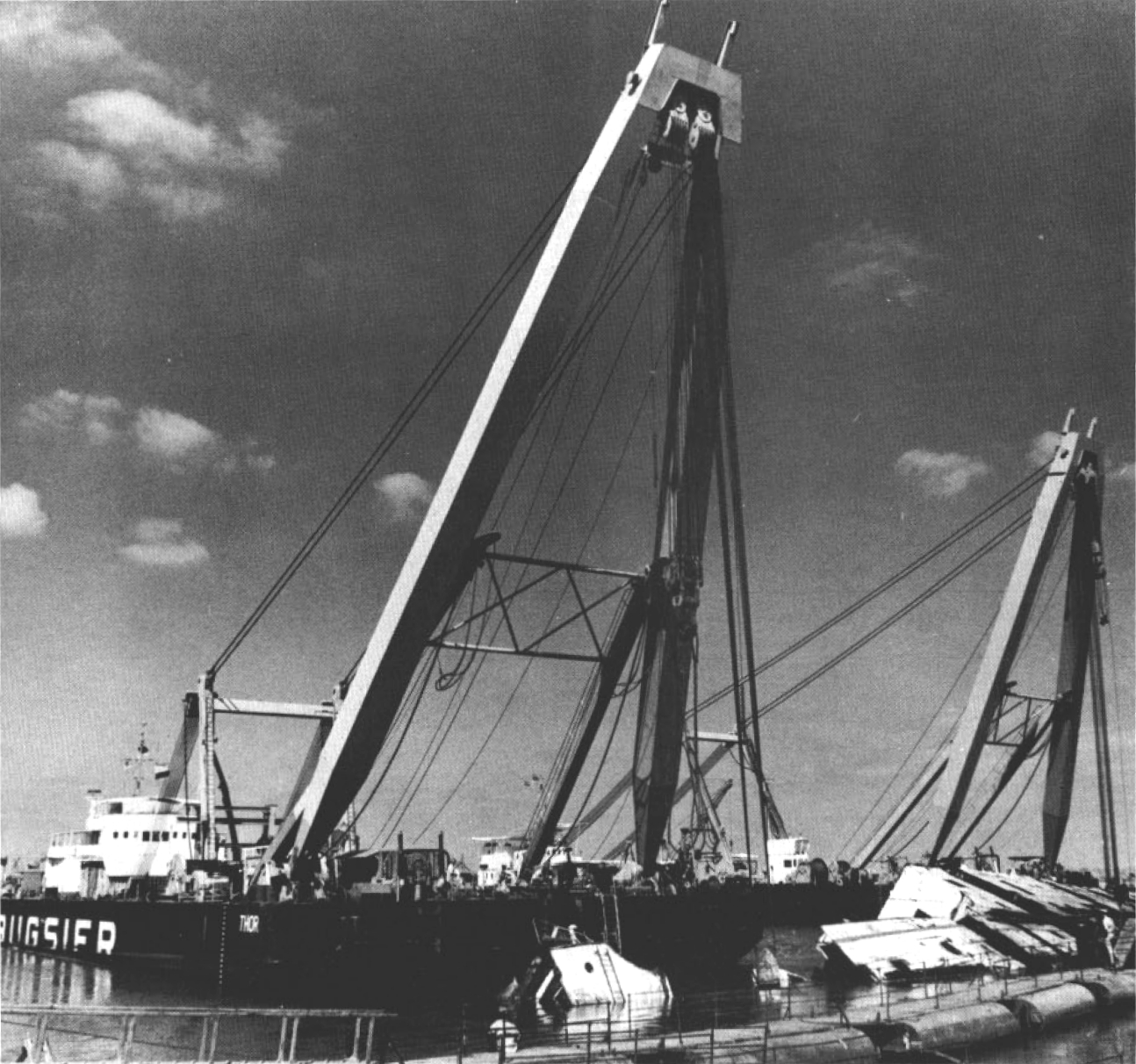
Roland and Thor clearing a wreck in the Suez Canal, 1975.

Her wreck was cleared by the salvage ships Roland and Thor in 1974 as part of the operation to reopen the canal. Magd lay on her starboard side at a position 159.90 kilometres (99.36 mi) from Port Said. The wreck was cut in two by explosives on 6 November. The stern section was removed on 14 November and the bow section on 23 November. The work was carried out by the Murphy Pacific Marine Salvage Company under the direction of the Supervisor of Salvage, United States Navy.
