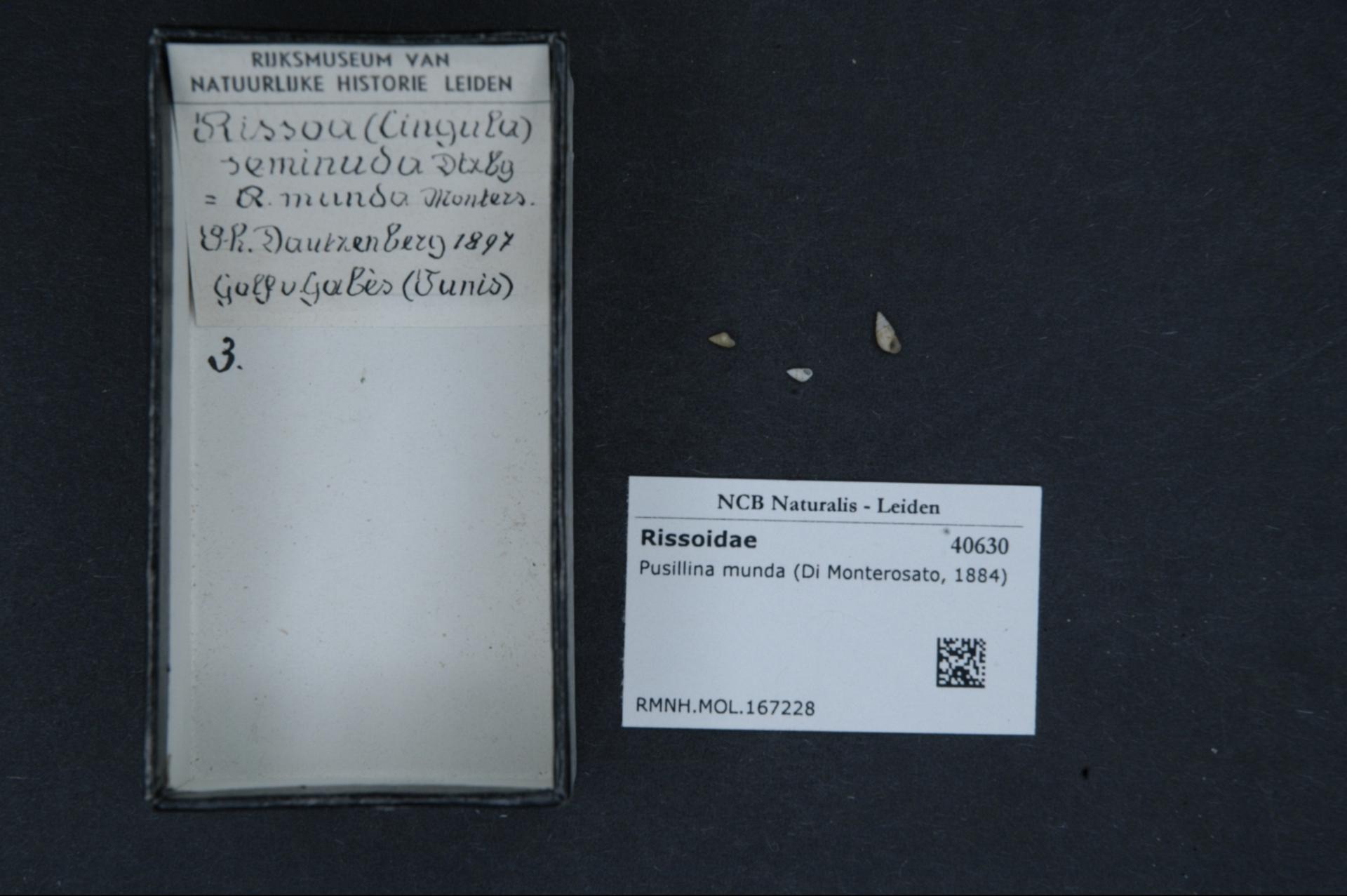

Scientific classification
- Kingdom: Animalia
- Phylum: Mollusca
- Class: Gastropoda
- Subclass: Caenogastropoda
- Order: Littorinimorpha
- Family: Rissoidae
- Genus: Pusillina
- Species: P. munda

Binomial name
- Pusillina munda (Monterosato, 1884)

= Pusillina munda =

Species of gastropod

Pusillina munda is a species of small sea snail, a marine gastropod mollusk or micromollusk in the family Rissoidae.
