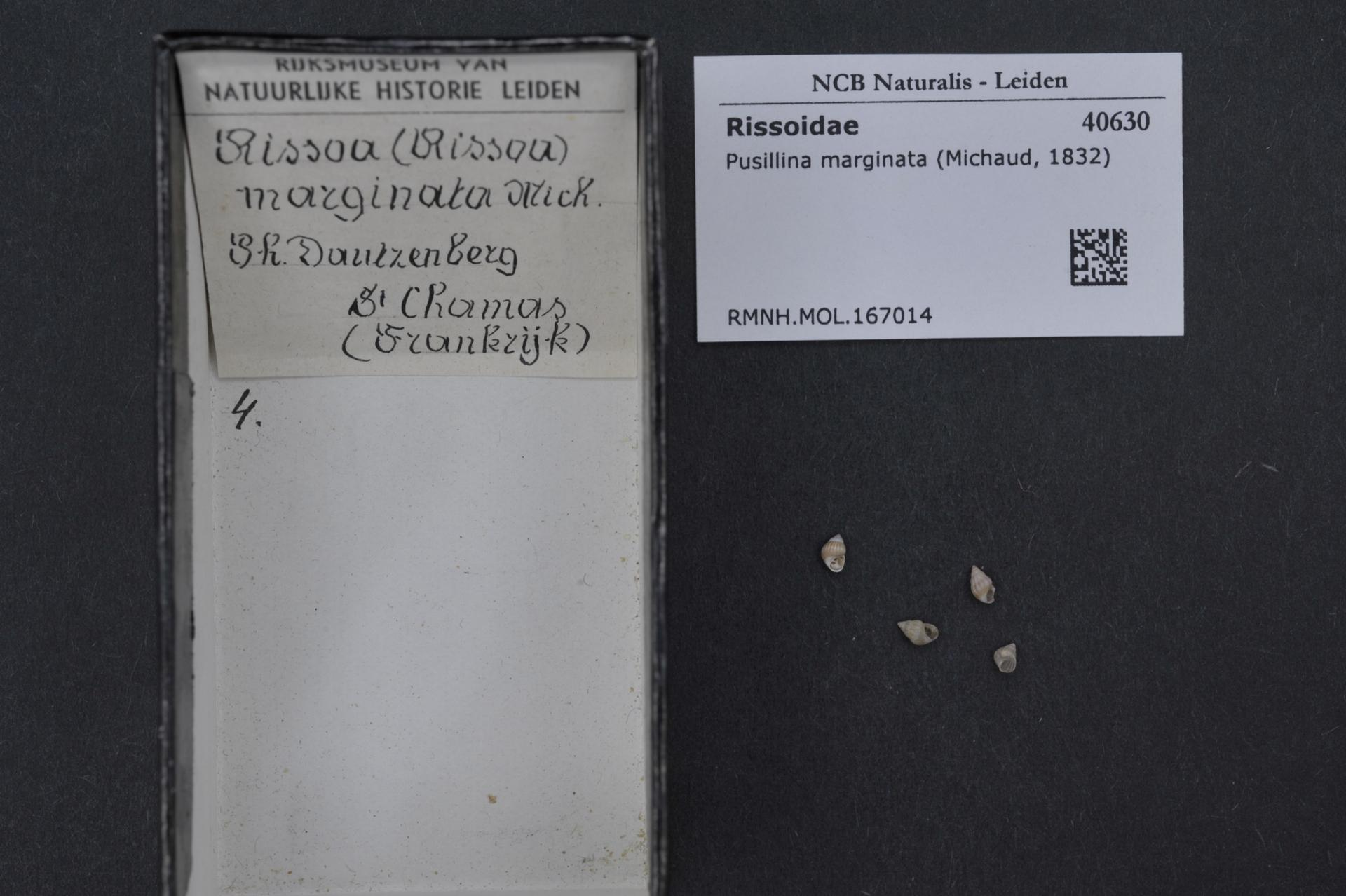

Scientific classification
- Kingdom: Animalia
- Phylum: Mollusca
- Class: Gastropoda
- Subclass: Caenogastropoda
- Order: Littorinimorpha
- Family: Rissoidae
- Genus: Pusillina
- Species: P. marginata

Binomial name
- Pusillina marginata (Michaud, 1832)

= Pusillina marginata =

Species of gastropod

Pusillina marginata is a species of minute sea snail, a marine gastropod mollusk or micromollusk in the family Rissoidae.
