= P. ehrenbergii =

P. ehrenbergii may refer to:

- Platax ehrenbergii, a tropical fish
- Pleurotaenium ehrenbergii, a unicellular algae
- Poronia ehrenbergii, a sac fungus

== See also ==
- P. ehrenbergi (disambiguation)
