= Pusillina kazakhstanica =

Pusillina kazakhstanica Temporal range: Eocene

Scientific classification
- Domain: Eukaryota
- Kingdom: Animalia
- Phylum: Mollusca
- Class: Gastropoda
- Subclass: Caenogastropoda
- Order: Littorinimorpha
- Family: Rissoidae
- Genus: Pusillina
- Species: P. kazakhstanica

Binomial name
- Pusillina kazakhstanica Amitrov, 2010

Extinct species of gastropod

Pusillina kazakhstanica is an extinct species of fossil sea snail, a marine gastropod mollusk in the family Rissoidae.

This species of snail existed in what is now Kazakhstan during the Eocene period. It was described by O. V. Amitrov in 2010.
