= Pusillina ehrenbergii =

Scientific classification
- Kingdom: Animalia
- Phylum: Mollusca
- Class: Gastropoda
- Subclass: Caenogastropoda
- Order: Littorinimorpha
- Family: Rissoidae
- Genus: Pusillina
- Species: P. ehrenbergii

Binomial name
- Pusillina ehrenbergii (Philippi, 1844)

Synonyms
- Pusillina ehrenbergi (Philippi, 1844) · unaccepted (incorrect subsequent spelling); Rissoa ehrenbergi Philippi, 1844 · unaccepted (incorrect subsequent spelling); Rissoa ehrenbergii Philippi, 1844 · unaccepted (Pusillina accepted as full genus); Rissoa oenonensis Brusina, 1866 · unaccepted (dubious synonym); Turboella ehrenbergi (Philippi, 1844) · unaccepted

Species of gastropod

Pusillina ehrenbergii is a species of small sea snail, a marine gastropod mollusk or micromollusk in the family Rissoidae.
