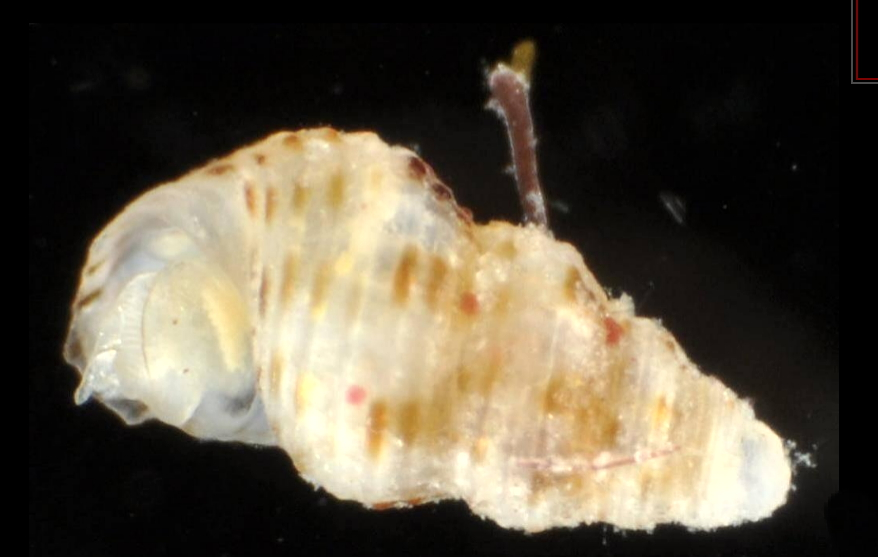
- Shell of Alvania isolata (specimen at the Smithsonian Institution)

Scientific classification
- Kingdom: Animalia
- Phylum: Mollusca
- Class: Gastropoda
- Subclass: Caenogastropoda
- Order: Littorinimorpha
- Superfamily: Rissooidea
- Family: Rissoidae
- Genus: Alvania
- Species: A. isolata

Binomial name
- Alvania isolata (Laseron, 1956)

Synonyms
- Haurakia isolata Laseron, 1956

= Alvania isolata =

Species of gastropod

Alvania isolata is a species of small sea snail, a marine gastropod mollusk or micromollusk in the family Rissoidae.

== Distribution ==
This species occurs in the Indian Ocean off Christmas Island and off the Society Islands, French Polynesia.
