= Alvania kermadecensis =

Scientific classification
- Kingdom: Animalia
- Phylum: Mollusca
- Class: Gastropoda
- Subclass: Caenogastropoda
- Order: Littorinimorpha
- Superfamily: Rissooidea
- Family: Rissoidae
- Genus: Alvania
- Species: A. kermadecensis

Binomial name
- Alvania kermadecensis (W. R. B. Oliver, 1915)

Synonyms
- Haurakia kermadecensis W. R. B. Oliver, 1915

Species of gastropod

Alvania kermadecensis is a species of small sea snail, a marine gastropod mollusk or micromollusk in the family Rissoidae.

This species was first described by Walter Oliver in 1915 and originally named Haurakia kermadecensis.

== Description ==
The shell measures 1.8 mm in height and 1 mm in diameter.

(Original description) The shell is ovate, with a blunt apex and a broadly ovate aperture. It has five whorls, which are rounded and separated by an impressed suture. The inner lip is slightly detached, leaving a small umbilical depression.

The sculpture begins with a protoconch of one and a half whorls, which is spirally ribbed; the lower whorl bears four spiral ribs. On the first adult whorl, pronounced longitudinal plications appear, crossed by three spiral ribs, two near the upper suture and one near the lower suture, with slight beading at their intersections. On the succeeding whorls, the three spirals become more pronounced, while the central area is faintly spirally ribbed and the axial plications remain fairly prominent. On the body whorl, the longitudinal sculpture disappears at the periphery, and about twelve spiral ribs remain, of which the uppermost is the most prominent and the fourth and fifth are the least so.

The shell is white with spiral brown lines. The protoconch ribs are brown, as are the two upper and the lower spiral ribs on the succeeding whorls, and the first to third and sixth to tenth spirals on the body whorl, leaving the two peripheral spirals white.

== Distribution ==
This marine species occurs off the Kermadec Islands, New Zealand.
