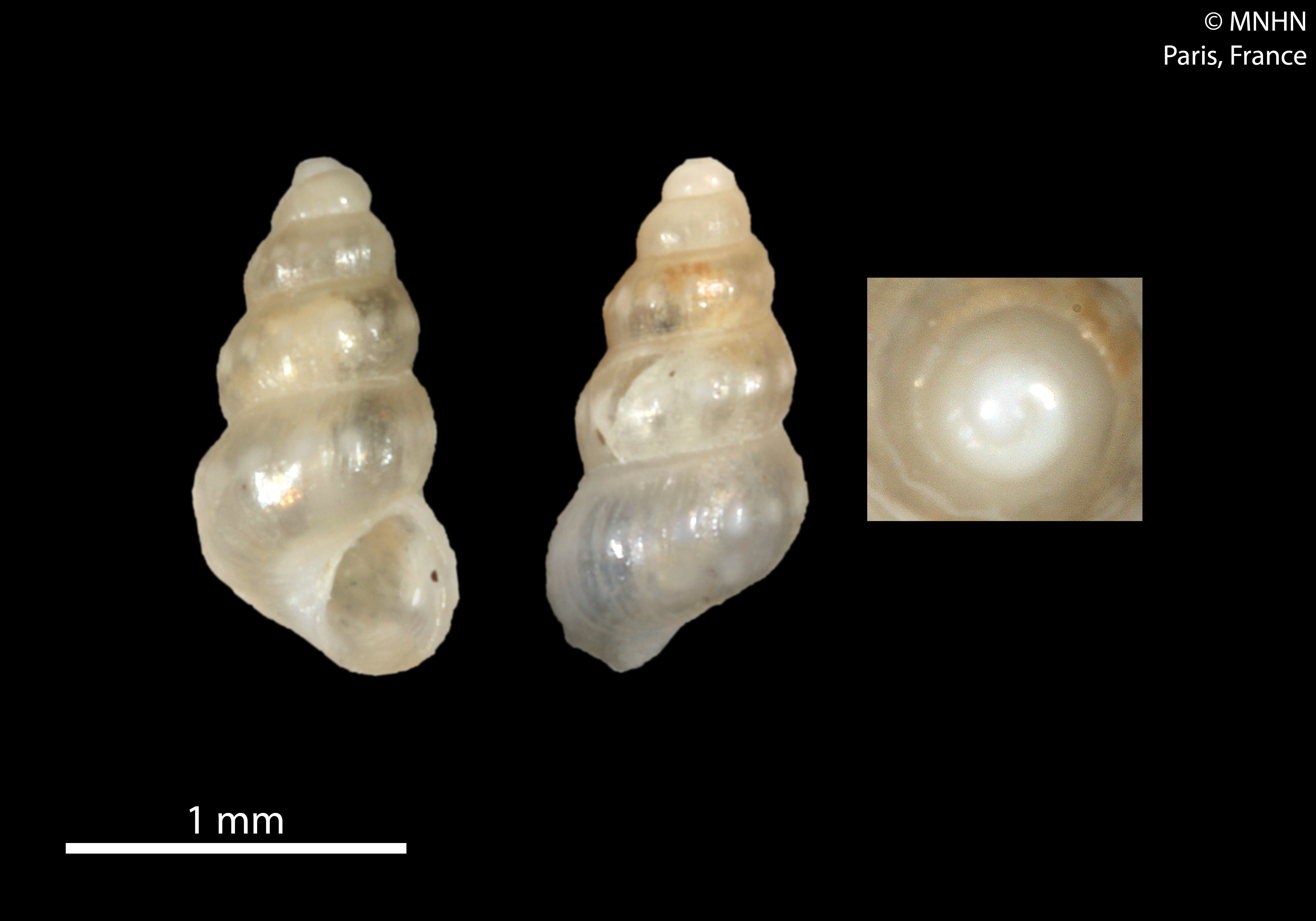
- Shell of Haurakia sufflata (paratype at MNHN, Paris)

Scientific classification
- Kingdom: Animalia
- Phylum: Mollusca
- Class: Gastropoda
- Subclass: Caenogastropoda
- Order: Littorinimorpha
- Family: Rissoidae
- Genus: Haurakia
- Species: H. sufflava

Binomial name
- Haurakia sufflava (Cecalupo & Perugia, 2009)

Synonyms
- Pusillina (Haurakia) sufflava Cecalupo & Perugia, 2009; Pusillina sufflava Cecalupo & Perugia, 2009

= Haurakia sufflava =

Species of gastropod

Haurakia sufflava is a species of small sea snail, a marine gastropod mollusc or micromollusc in the family Rissoidae.

== Distribution ==
This marine species occurs off South Madagascar.
