= Pusillina radiata =

Scientific classification
- Kingdom: Animalia
- Phylum: Mollusca
- Class: Gastropoda
- Subclass: Caenogastropoda
- Order: Littorinimorpha
- Family: Rissoidae
- Genus: Pusillina
- Species: P. radiata

Binomial name
- Pusillina radiata (Philippi, 1836)

Species of gastropod

Pusillina radiata is a species of small sea snail, a marine gastropod mollusk or micromollusk in the family Rissoidae.
