= Crisilla quisquiliarum =

Scientific classification
- Kingdom: Animalia
- Phylum: Mollusca
- Class: Gastropoda
- Subclass: Caenogastropoda
- Order: Littorinimorpha
- Family: Rissoidae
- Genus: Crisilla
- Species: C. quisquiliarum

Binomial name
- Crisilla quisquiliarum (Watson, 1886)

Synonyms
- Pusillina quisquiliarum (R.B. Watson, 1886); Rissoa (Setia) quisquiliarum R.B. Watson, 1886; Setia quisquiliarum (R. B. Watson, 1886)

Species of gastropod

Crisilla quisquiliarum is a species of small sea snail, a marine gastropod mollusk or micromollusk in the family Rissoidae.
