= Alvania venusta =

Scientific classification
- Kingdom: Animalia
- Phylum: Mollusca
- Class: Gastropoda
- Subclass: Caenogastropoda
- Order: Littorinimorpha
- Superfamily: Rissooidea
- Family: Rissoidae
- Genus: Alvania
- Species: A. venusta

Binomial name
- Alvania venusta (A. W. B. Powell, 1926)

Synonyms
- Alvania (Linemera) venusta (A. W. B. Powell, 1926) · alternate representation; Alvinia (Linemera) venusta (A. W. B. Powell, 1926) (superseded combination); Haurakia venusta A. W. B. Powell, 1926 (superseded combination)

Species of gastropod

Alvania venusta is a species of small sea snail, a marine gastropod mollusk or micromollusk in the family Rissoidae.

== Description ==
The length of the shell attains 3 mm, its diameter 1.5 mm.

== Distribution ==
This marine species is endemic to New Zealand and occurs off Lyttelton and off Chatham Rise.
