= Alvania aupouria =

Scientific classification
- Kingdom: Animalia
- Phylum: Mollusca
- Class: Gastropoda
- Subclass: Caenogastropoda
- Order: Littorinimorpha
- Superfamily: Rissooidea
- Family: Rissoidae
- Genus: Alvania
- Species: A. aupouria

Binomial name
- Alvania aupouria (A. W. B. Powell, 1937)

Synonyms
- Alvania (Linemera) aupouria (A. W. B. Powell, 1937) · alternate representation; Alvinia (Linemera) aupouria (A. W. B. Powell, 1937) (superseded combination); Haurakia aupouria A. W. B. Powell, 1937 (superseded combination); Pusillina (Haurakia) aupouria (A. W. B. Powell, 1937) (superseded combination); Pusillina aupouria (A. W. B. Powell, 1937) (superseded combination)

Species of gastropod

Alvania aupouria is a species of minute sea snail, a marine gastropod mollusk or micromollusk in the family Rissoidae.

== Description ==
The length of the shell attains 2.05 mm, its diameter 1.25 mm.

== Distribution ==
This marine species is endemic to New Zealand and occurs off Three Kings Islands.
