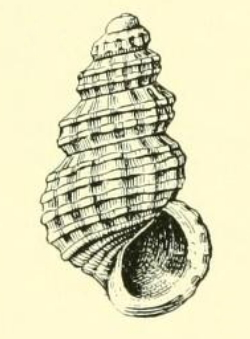
- Shell of Alvania pariana (holotype)

Scientific classification
- Kingdom: Animalia
- Phylum: Mollusca
- Class: Gastropoda
- Subclass: Caenogastropoda
- Order: Littorinimorpha
- Superfamily: Rissooidea
- Family: Rissoidae
- Genus: Alvania
- Species: †A. pariana

Binomial name
- †Alvania pariana (Guppy, 1896)

Synonyms
- † Rissoa (Alvania) pariana Guppy, 1896 (Alvania accepted as full genus)

= Alvania pariana =

Species of gastropod

Alvania pariana is an extinct species of minute sea snail, a marine gastropod mollusc or micromollusk in the family Rissoidae.

== Description ==
The length of the shell attains 2.3 mm, its diameter 1.5 mm.

(Original description) The turreted shell is conic-oblong. It contains about 6 whorls. They are decorated by about 4 spiral ribs narrower than their interstices, upon which rise into points somewhat stout longitudinal costae, forming subquadrate or oblong pits, in which some faint striae may be observed. The apex is smooth. The base has about 4 spiral ribs. The outer lip is stout and expanded.

== Distribution ==
Fossils of this species were found in Tertiary strata in Trinidad.
