= Alvania heraelaciniae =

Scientific classification
- Kingdom: Animalia
- Phylum: Mollusca
- Class: Gastropoda
- Subclass: Caenogastropoda
- Order: Littorinimorpha
- Superfamily: Rissooidea
- Family: Rissoidae
- Genus: Alvania
- Species: †A. heraelaciniae

Binomial name
- †Alvania heraelaciniae Ruggieri, 1950

Synonyms
- † Rissoa heralaciniae (incorrect subsequent spelling; not a Rissoa)

Extinct species of gastropod

Alvania heraelaciniae is an extinct species of minute sea snail, a marine gastropod mollusk or micromollusk in the family Rissoidae.

== Distribution ==
Fossils have been found in Italy.
