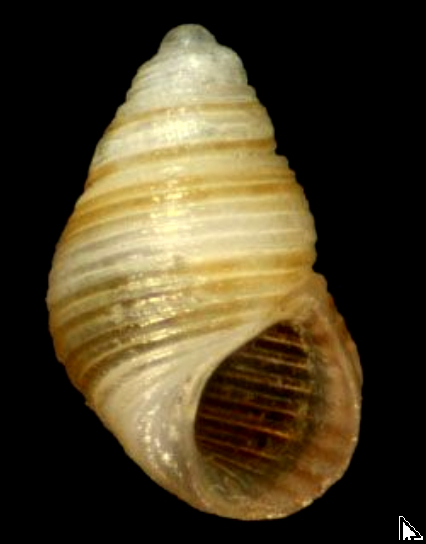
- Shell of Alvania planciusi (specimen at the Natural History Museum, Rotterdam)

Scientific classification
- Kingdom: Animalia
- Phylum: Mollusca
- Class: Gastropoda
- Subclass: Caenogastropoda
- Order: Littorinimorpha
- Family: Rissoidae
- Genus: Alvania
- Species: A. planciusi

Binomial name
- Alvania planciusi Moolenbeek & Rolán, 1988

= Alvania planciusi =

Species of gastropod

Alvania planciusi is a species of small sea snail, a marine gastropod mollusk or micromollusk in the family Rissoidae.

== Description ==
The length of the shell attains 2.5 mm

== Distribution ==
This species occurs in the Atlantic Ocean off Cape Verde.
