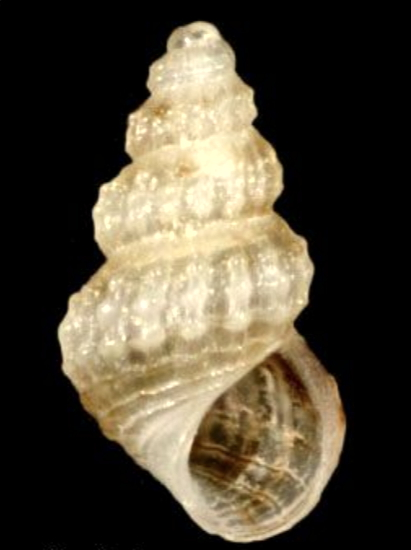
- Shell of Alvania clarae (specimen at the Natural History Museum, Rotterdam)

Scientific classification
- Kingdom: Animalia
- Phylum: Mollusca
- Class: Gastropoda
- Subclass: Caenogastropoda
- Order: Littorinimorpha
- Family: Rissoidae
- Genus: Alvania
- Species: A. clarae

Binomial name
- Alvania clarae (Nofroni & Pizzini, 1991)

= Alvania clarae =

Species of gastropod

abc

Alvania clarae is a species of minute sea snail, a marine gastropod mollusk or micromollusk in the family Rissoidae.

== Description ==
The length of the shell varies between 1.5 mm and 3 mm.

== Distribution ==
This marine species occurs in the Ionian Sea off the island of Zakinthos, Greece
