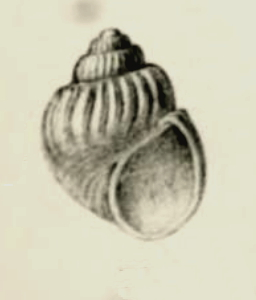
- Shell of Alvania townsendi (holotypz)

Scientific classification
- Kingdom: Animalia
- Phylum: Mollusca
- Class: Gastropoda
- Subclass: Caenogastropoda
- Order: Littorinimorpha
- Superfamily: Rissooidea
- Family: Rissoidae
- Genus: Alvania
- Species: A. townsendi

Binomial name
- Alvania townsendi (Melvill, 1910)

Synonyms
- Rissoa (Apicularia) townsendi Melvill, 1910

= Alvania townsendi =

Species of gastropod

Alvania townsendi is a species of small sea snail, a marine gastropod mollusk or micromollusk in the family Rissoidae.

== Description ==
The length of the shell 2.75 mm, its diameter 1.75mm.

The small, white shell is inflated, very thin, fragile, undergrounded. The shell contains 3 to 5 whorls, of which the two apical ones are pearly, white. The others are graduated, ventricose and smooth. They are much impressed at the sutures. The shell is longitudinally obliquely ribbed. The ribs are indistinct and superficial. They disappear completely at the base and are spirally striated everywhere. The aperture is round and continuous, with a thin peristoma. The columella is slightly excavated.

This is an inflated, gradately-whorled Alvania of great tenuity, being evidently an abyssal species. It differs from Benthonellania charope (Melvill & Standen, 1901) altogetlier in sculpture, and also from Rissoa versoverana, both these being inhabitants of the same seas. This last is a much more solidly constructed shell, more compact, of brown colour, or white flecked with brown, two forms occurring, one of which, owing to its obese body whorl, the more approximates Alvania townsendi

== Distribution ==
The species occurs in the Gulf of Oman.
