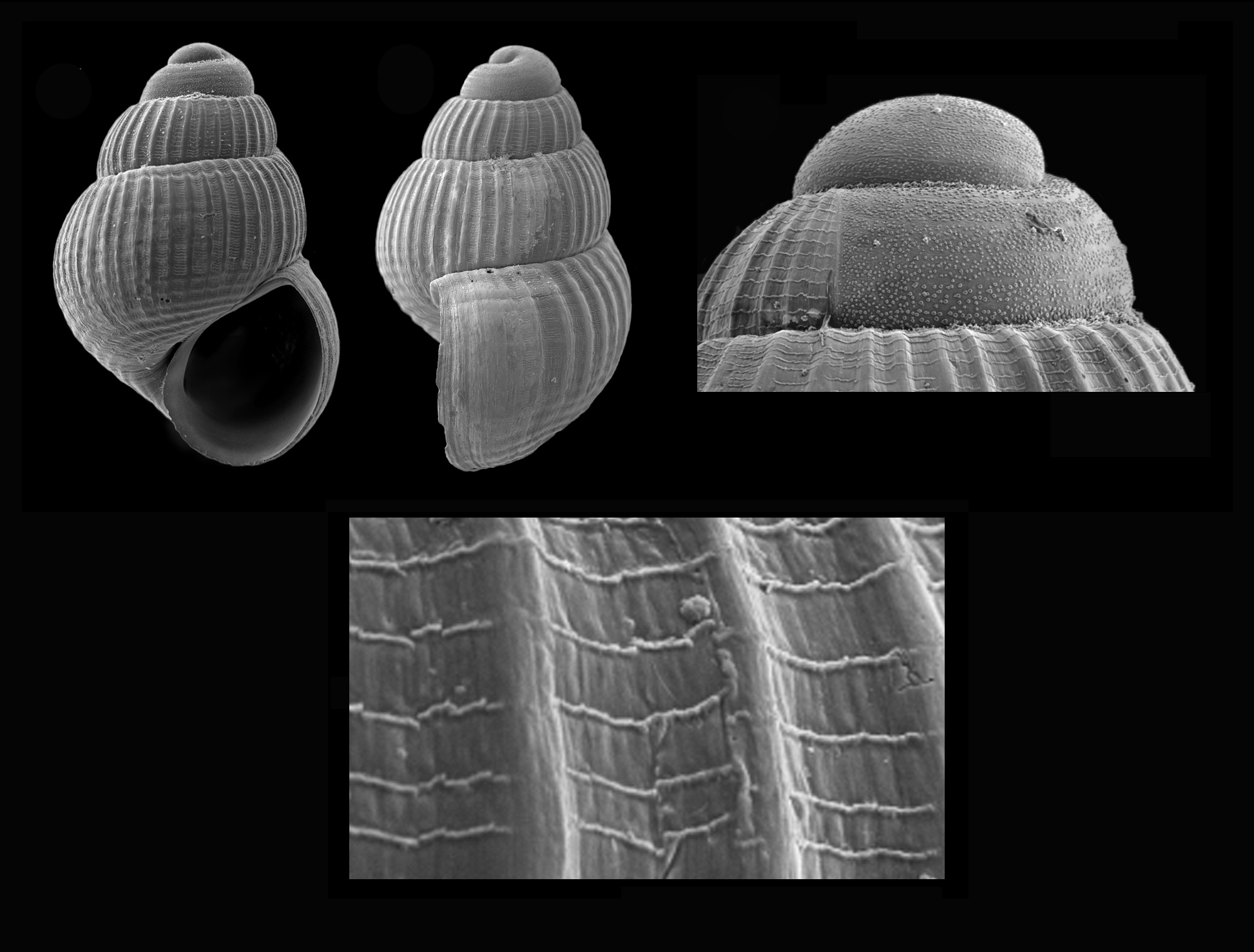
- Shell of Alvania seinensis (holotype at MNHN, Paris)

Scientific classification
- Kingdom: Animalia
- Phylum: Mollusca
- Class: Gastropoda
- Subclass: Caenogastropoda
- Order: Littorinimorpha
- Family: Rissoidae
- Genus: Alvania
- Species: A. seinensis

Binomial name
- Alvania seinensis Gofas, 2007

= Alvania seinensis =

Species of gastropod

Alvania seinensis is a species of a minute sea snail, a marine gastropod mollusk or micromollusk in the family Rissoidae.

== Description ==
The length of the shell attains 1.4 mm.

== Distribution ==
This species occurs in the Northeast Atlantic Ocean off the Seine Seamount near Madeira.
