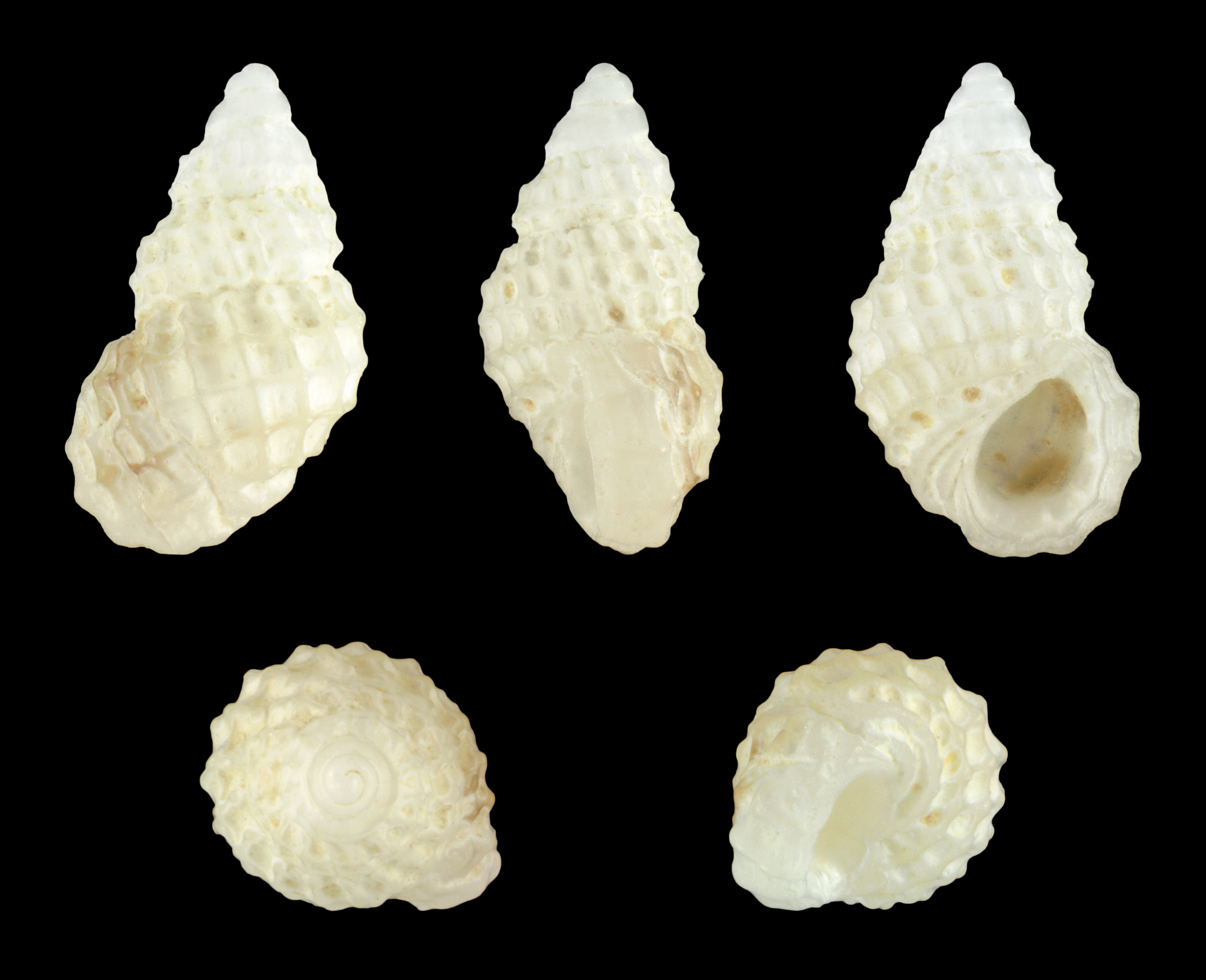

Scientific classification
- Kingdom: Animalia
- Phylum: Mollusca
- Class: Gastropoda
- Subclass: Caenogastropoda
- Order: Littorinimorpha
- Family: Rissoidae
- Genus: Alvania
- Species: A. balearica

Binomial name
- Alvania balearica Oliver & Templado, 2009

= Alvania balearica =

Species of gastropod

Alvania balearica is a species of small sea snail, a marine gastropod mollusk or micromollusk in the family Rissoidae.

== Description ==
The length of the shell attains 2.2 mm.

== Distribution ==
This marine species occurs off the Balearic Islands and Greece.
