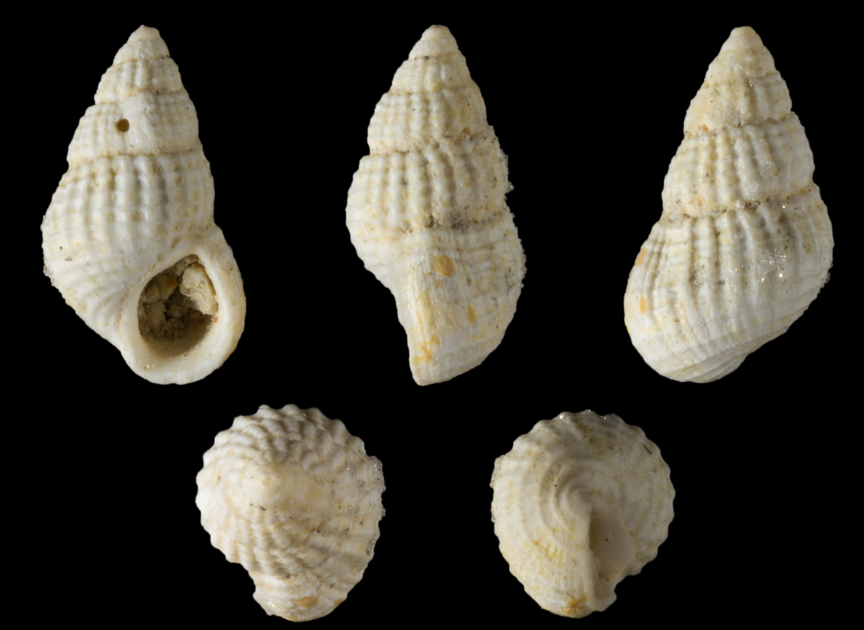
- Shell of Alvania barreti (specimen at MNHN, Paris)

Scientific classification
- Kingdom: Animalia
- Phylum: Mollusca
- Class: Gastropoda
- Subclass: Caenogastropoda
- Order: Littorinimorpha
- Superfamily: Rissooidea
- Family: Rissoidae
- Genus: Alvania
- Species: †A. barreti

Binomial name
- †Alvania barreti (Morlet, 1885)

Synonyms
- † Alvania (Acinulus) barreti (Morlet, 1885à; † Rissoa barreti Morlet, 1885 (basionym; does not belong to Rissoa)

= Alvania barreti =

Species of gastropod

Alvania barreti is an extinct species of minute sea snail, a marine gastropod mollusc or micromollusk in the family Rissoidae.

== Description ==
The length of the shell attains 3.5 mm, its diameter 1.2 mm.

== Distribution ==
Fossils of this species were found in late Eocene strata in Île-de-France, France.
