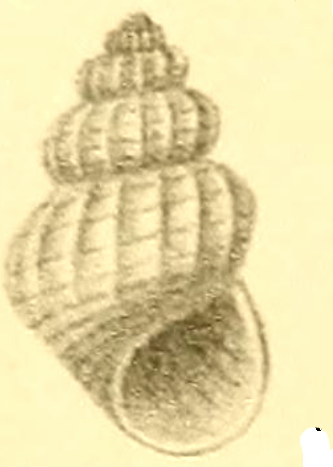
- Shell of Alvania thalia (holotype)

Scientific classification
- Kingdom: Animalia
- Phylum: Mollusca
- Class: Gastropoda
- Subclass: Caenogastropoda
- Order: Littorinimorpha
- Superfamily: Rissooidea
- Family: Rissoidae
- Genus: Alvania
- Species: †A. thalia

Binomial name
- †Alvania thalia De Stefani & Pantanelli, 1888

= Alvania thalia =

Species of gastropod

Alvania thalia is an extinct species of minute sea snail, a marine gastropod mollusc or micromollusk in the family Rissoidae.

== Varieties ==
- † Alvania thalia var. exbrevis Sacco, 1895
- † Alvania thalia var. subacingulata Sacco, 1895

== Description ==
The length of the shell attains 4.9 mm, its diameter is 1.8 mm.

== Distribution ==
Fossils of this marine species were found in Pliocene strata off Siena, Italy.
