= Alvania turkensis =

Scientific classification
- Kingdom: Animalia
- Phylum: Mollusca
- Class: Gastropoda
- Subclass: Caenogastropoda
- Order: Littorinimorpha
- Family: Rissoidae
- Genus: Alvania
- Species: A. turkensis

Binomial name
- Alvania turkensis Faber & Moolenbeek, 2004

Species of gastropod

Alvania turkensis is a species of minute sea snail, a marine gastropod mollusk or micromollusk in the family Rissoidae.

== Distribution ==
This species occurs in the tropical West Atlantic Ocean.

== Description ==
The maximum recorded shell length is 1.2 mm.

== Habitat ==
Its minimum recorded depth is 20 m and its maximum recorded depth is 20 m.
