= Alvania holsatica =

Scientific classification
- Kingdom: Animalia
- Phylum: Mollusca
- Class: Gastropoda
- Subclass: Caenogastropoda
- Order: Littorinimorpha
- Superfamily: Rissooidea
- Family: Rissoidae
- Genus: Alvania
- Species: †A. holsatica

Binomial name
- †Alvania holsatica H.-J. Anderson, 1960

Species of gastropod

Alvania holsatica is an extinct species of minute sea snail, a marine gastropod mollusk or micromollusk in the family Rissoidae.

== Distribution ==
Fossils have been found in Miocene strata in North Germany.
