= Alvania bonellii =

Scientific classification
- Kingdom: Animalia
- Phylum: Mollusca
- Class: Gastropoda
- Subclass: Caenogastropoda
- Order: Littorinimorpha
- Superfamily: Rissooidea
- Family: Rissoidae
- Genus: Alvania
- Species: †A. bonellii

Binomial name
- †Alvania bonellii Palazzi, 1996

Extinct species of gastropod

Alvania bonellii is an extinct species of minute sea snail, a marine gastropod mollusc or micromollusk in the family Rissoidae.

== Distribution ==
Fossils of this species were found in Upper Pliocene strata in Piedmont, Italy>..
