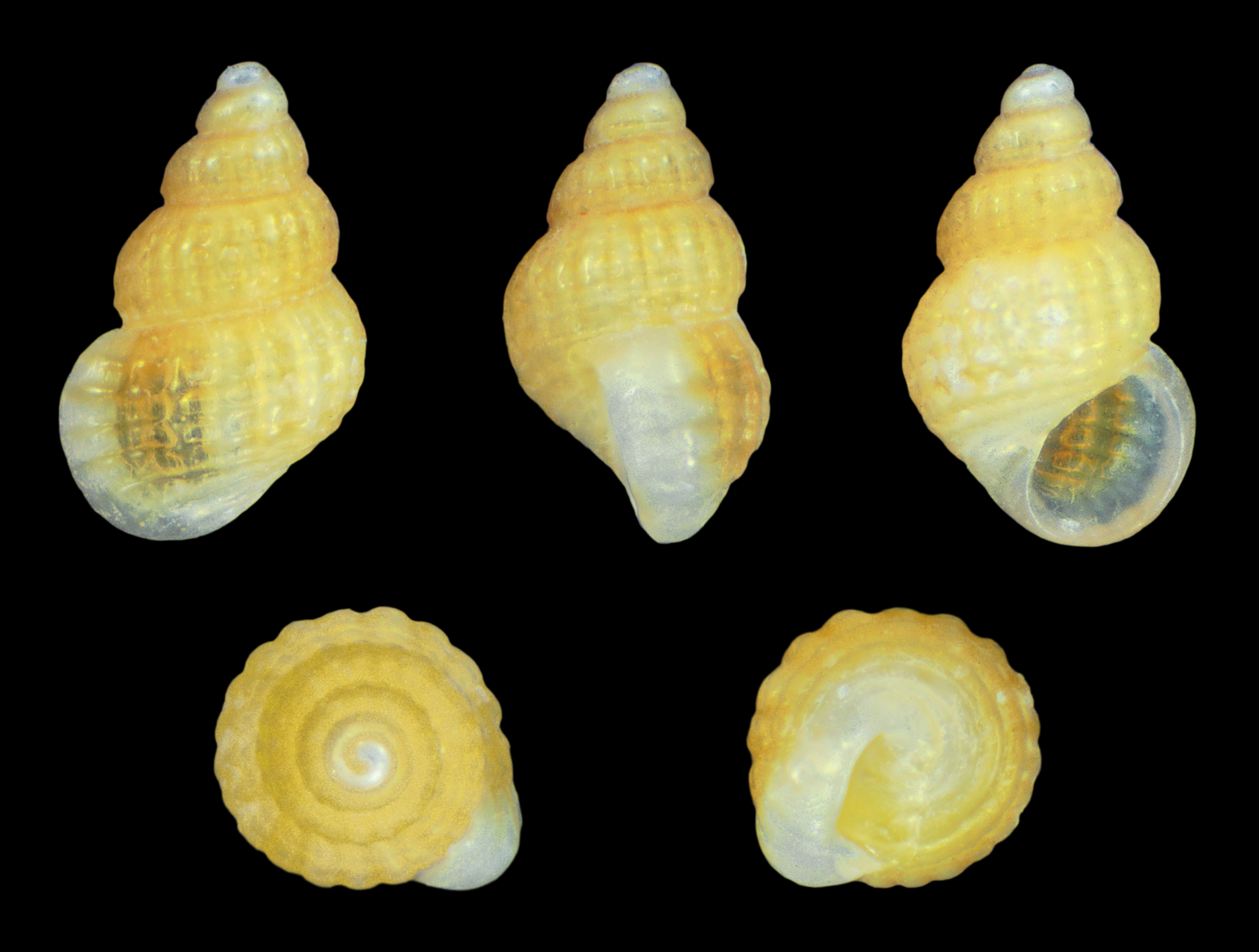

Scientific classification
- Kingdom: Animalia
- Phylum: Mollusca
- Class: Gastropoda
- Subclass: Caenogastropoda
- Order: Littorinimorpha
- Family: Rissoidae
- Genus: Alvania
- Species: A. grancanariensis

Binomial name
- Alvania grancanariensis Segers, 1999

= Alvania grancanariensis =

Species of gastropod

Alvania grancanariensis is a species of small sea snail, a marine gastropod mollusk or micromollusk in the family Rissoidae.

== Description ==
The length of the shell attains 1.5 mm.

== Distribution ==
The species has been found on the shores of the island of Gran Canaria.
