= Alvania villarii =

Scientific classification
- Kingdom: Animalia
- Phylum: Mollusca
- Class: Gastropoda
- Subclass: Caenogastropoda
- Order: Littorinimorpha
- Family: Rissoidae
- Genus: Alvania
- Species: A. villarii

Binomial name
- Alvania villarii Micali, Tisselli & Giunchi, 2005

Species of gastropod

Alvania villarii is a species of minute sea snail, a marine gastropod mollusk or micromollusk in the family Rissoidae.

== Distribution ==
This species occurs in the Western Mediterranean Sea off Italy and Greece.
