= Alvania aartseni =

Scientific classification
- Kingdom: Animalia
- Phylum: Mollusca
- Class: Gastropoda
- Subclass: Caenogastropoda
- Order: Littorinimorpha
- Family: Rissoidae
- Genus: Alvania
- Species: A. aartseni

Binomial name
- Alvania aartseni Verduin, 1986

Species of gastropod

Alvania aartseni is a species of small sea snail, a marine gastropod mollusk or micromollusk in the family Rissoidae.
