= Alvania dejongi =

Scientific classification
- Kingdom: Animalia
- Phylum: Mollusca
- Class: Gastropoda
- Subclass: Caenogastropoda
- Order: Littorinimorpha
- Family: Rissoidae
- Genus: Alvania
- Species: A. dejongi

Binomial name
- Alvania dejongi Faber & Moolenbeek, 2004

Species of gastropod

Alvania dejongi is a species of minute sea snail, a marine gastropod mollusk or micromollusk in the family Rissoidae.

== Distribution ==
This species occurs in the tropical Western Atlantic Ocean.

== Description ==
The maximum recorded shell length is 1.25 mm.

== Habitat ==
Minimum recorded depth is 0 m. Maximum recorded depth is 23 m.
