= Alvania antwerpiensis =

Scientific classification
- Kingdom: Animalia
- Phylum: Mollusca
- Class: Gastropoda
- Subclass: Caenogastropoda
- Order: Littorinimorpha
- Superfamily: Rissooidea
- Family: Rissoidae
- Genus: Alvania
- Species: †A. antwerpiensis

Binomial name
- †Alvania antwerpiensis Glibert, 1952

Species of gastropod

Alvania antwerpiensis is an extinct species of minute sea snail, a marine gastropod mollusc or micromollusk in the family Rissoidae.

== Distribution ==
Fossils of this species were found in Miocene strata in Belgium, the Netherlands and Germany (age range: 15.97 to 11.608 Ma)
