= Alvania gontsharovae =

Scientific classification
- Kingdom: Animalia
- Phylum: Mollusca
- Class: Gastropoda
- Subclass: Caenogastropoda
- Order: Littorinimorpha
- Superfamily: Rissooidea
- Family: Rissoidae
- Genus: Alvania
- Species: †A. gontsharovae

Binomial name
- †Alvania gontsharovae Iljina, 1993

Synonyms
- †

Species of gastropod

Alvania gontsharovae is an extinct species of minute sea snail, a marine gastropod mollusk or micromollusk in the family Rissoidae.

== Distribution ==
Fossils were found in Mid Miocene strata in Southwestern Eurasia.
