= Alvania versoverana =

Scientific classification
- Kingdom: Animalia
- Phylum: Mollusca
- Class: Gastropoda
- Subclass: Caenogastropoda
- Order: Littorinimorpha
- Superfamily: Rissooidea
- Family: Rissoidae
- Genus: Alvania
- Species: A. versoverana

Binomial name
- Alvania versoverana (Melvill, 1893)

Synonyms
- Rissoa versoverana Melvill, 1893 superseded combination

Species of gastropod

Alvania versoverana is a species of small sea snail, a marine gastropod mollusk or micromollusk in the family Rissoidae.

== Description ==
The length of the shell attains 2.2 mm.

(Original description in Latin) The small, delicate shell is ovate-oblong and semi-translucent. It contains six ventricose whorls, adpressed to the sutures. The sculpture consists of longitudinal, slightly oblique ribs. They almost cease to exist at the base of the body whorl. The shell has a delicate transverse liration. The aperture is round. The outer lip is thin and simple.

== Distribution ==
This species occurs in the Indian Ocean off Réunion.
