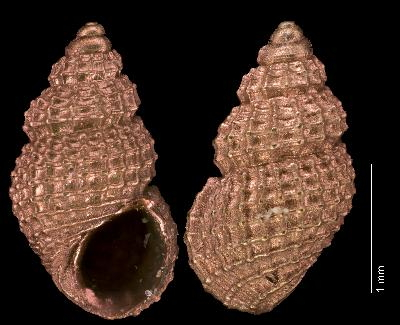
- Shell of Alvania africana (holotype at MNHN, Paris)

Scientific classification
- Kingdom: Animalia
- Phylum: Mollusca
- Class: Gastropoda
- Subclass: Caenogastropoda
- Order: Littorinimorpha
- Superfamily: Rissooidea
- Family: Rissoidae
- Genus: Alvania
- Species: A. africana

Binomial name
- Alvania africana Gofas, 1999

= Alvania africana =

Species of gastropod

Alvania africana is a species of small sea snail, a marine gastropod mollusk or micromollusk in the family Rissoidae.

== Description ==
The length of the shell varies between 2.6 mm and 4 mm.

== Distribution ==
This species occurs in the Atlantic Ocean off the Cape Verde, Mauritania and Angola.
