= Alvania brusinai =

Scientific classification
- Kingdom: Animalia
- Phylum: Mollusca
- Class: Gastropoda
- Subclass: Caenogastropoda
- Order: Littorinimorpha
- Superfamily: Rissooidea
- Family: Rissoidae
- Genus: Alvania
- Species: †A. brusinai

Binomial name
- †Alvania brusinai Schwartz von Mohrenstern, 1877

Species of gastropod

Alvania brusinai is an extinct species of minute sea snail, a marine gastropod mollusc or micromollusk in the family Rissoidae.

== Description ==
The length of the shell attains 2 mm, its diameter is 1.25 mm.

== Distribution ==
Fossils of this species were found near Vienna, Austria.
