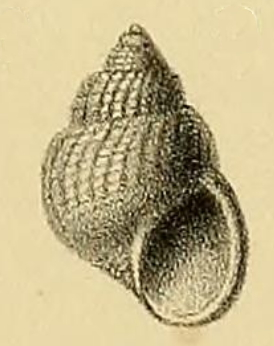
- Shell of Alvania chilensis (holotype)

Scientific classification
- Kingdom: Animalia
- Phylum: Mollusca
- Class: Gastropoda
- Subclass: Caenogastropoda
- Order: Littorinimorpha
- Superfamily: Rissooidea
- Family: Rissoidae
- Genus: Alvania
- Species: †A. chilensis

Binomial name
- †Alvania chilensis (R. A. Philippi, 1887)

Synonyms
- † Rissoa chilensis R. A. Philippi, 1887 ·

= Alvania chilensis =

Species of gastropod

Alvania chilensis is an extinct species of minute sea snail, a marine gastropod mollusc or micromollusk in the family Rissoidae.

== Description ==
The length of the shell attains 1¾ mm.

The minute shell has a globose-conical shape and is imperforate. The shell contains 5½ whorls. The sculpture consists of many longitudinal ribs. The aperture is ovate-orbicular. The inner lip is incrassate.

== Distribution ==
Fossils of this species were found in Tertiary strata in Chile.
