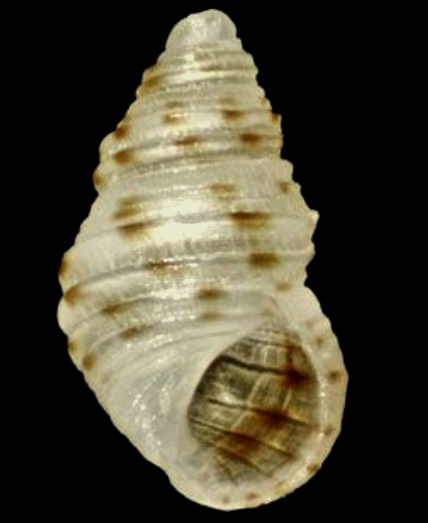
- Shell of Alvania stocki (specimen at the Natural History Museum, Rotterdam)

Scientific classification
- Kingdom: Animalia
- Phylum: Mollusca
- Class: Gastropoda
- Subclass: Caenogastropoda
- Order: Littorinimorpha
- Family: Rissoidae
- Genus: Alvania
- Species: A. stocki

Binomial name
- Alvania stocki Moolenbeek & Rolán, 1988

= Alvania stocki =

Species of gastropod

Alvania stocki is a species of minute sea snail, a marine gastropod mollusk or micromollusk in the family Rissoidae.

== Description ==
Alvania stocki is noted to possess a minute conic shell that is usually 2.5 mm high. Its shell consists of 6 convex whorls that include the 1.5 whorled smooth protoconch that is replaced by the teleoconch in which weak axial ribs on the first whorl increase in strength on subsequent ones that amount to approximately 12 on the penultimate whorl. The shell's surface is also decorated with spiral lines that are visible on the rounded base that harbors the strong columellar fold. The whorl's sutures are visible but not channelled while the aperture is nearly oval-shaped with a delicate outer lip and toothed columellar lip that bears minute tooth. White, the species is most likely originally to be found in the Cape Verde Islands at 10–20 meters depths that correspond to exposure to waters of the shallow-marine. Alvania stocki differs from the similar Alvania cimex in deeper axial ribs, spiral lines, and narrower measurements that make it qualify as special micromollusk of its group.

== Distribution ==
This species occurs in the Atlantic Ocean off Cape Verde.
