= Alvania cabrensis =

Scientific classification
- Kingdom: Animalia
- Phylum: Mollusca
- Class: Gastropoda
- Subclass: Caenogastropoda
- Order: Littorinimorpha
- Family: Rissoidae
- Genus: Alvania
- Species: A. cabrensis

Binomial name
- Alvania cabrensis Rolán & Hernández, 2007

Species of gastropod

Alvania cabrensis is a species of minute sea snail, a marine gastropod mollusc or micromollusc in the family Rissoidae.

== Description ==
The length of the shell attains 2.3 mm and has a spiral shape.

== Distribution ==
This species occurs off São Tomé and Principe and off West Africa.
