= Alvania euphrosine =

Scientific classification
- Kingdom: Animalia
- Phylum: Mollusca
- Class: Gastropoda
- Subclass: Caenogastropoda
- Order: Littorinimorpha
- Superfamily: Rissooidea
- Family: Rissoidae
- Genus: Alvania
- Species: †A. euphrosine

Binomial name
- †Alvania euphrosine De Stefani & Pantanelli, 1888

Species of gastropod

Alvania euphrosine is an extinct species of minute sea snail, a marine gastropod mollusc or micromollusk in the family Rissoidae.

== Description ==
The length of the shell attains 3.4 mm, its diameter 2 mm.

== Distribution ==
Fossils of this marine species were found in Pliocene strata off Siena, Italy.
