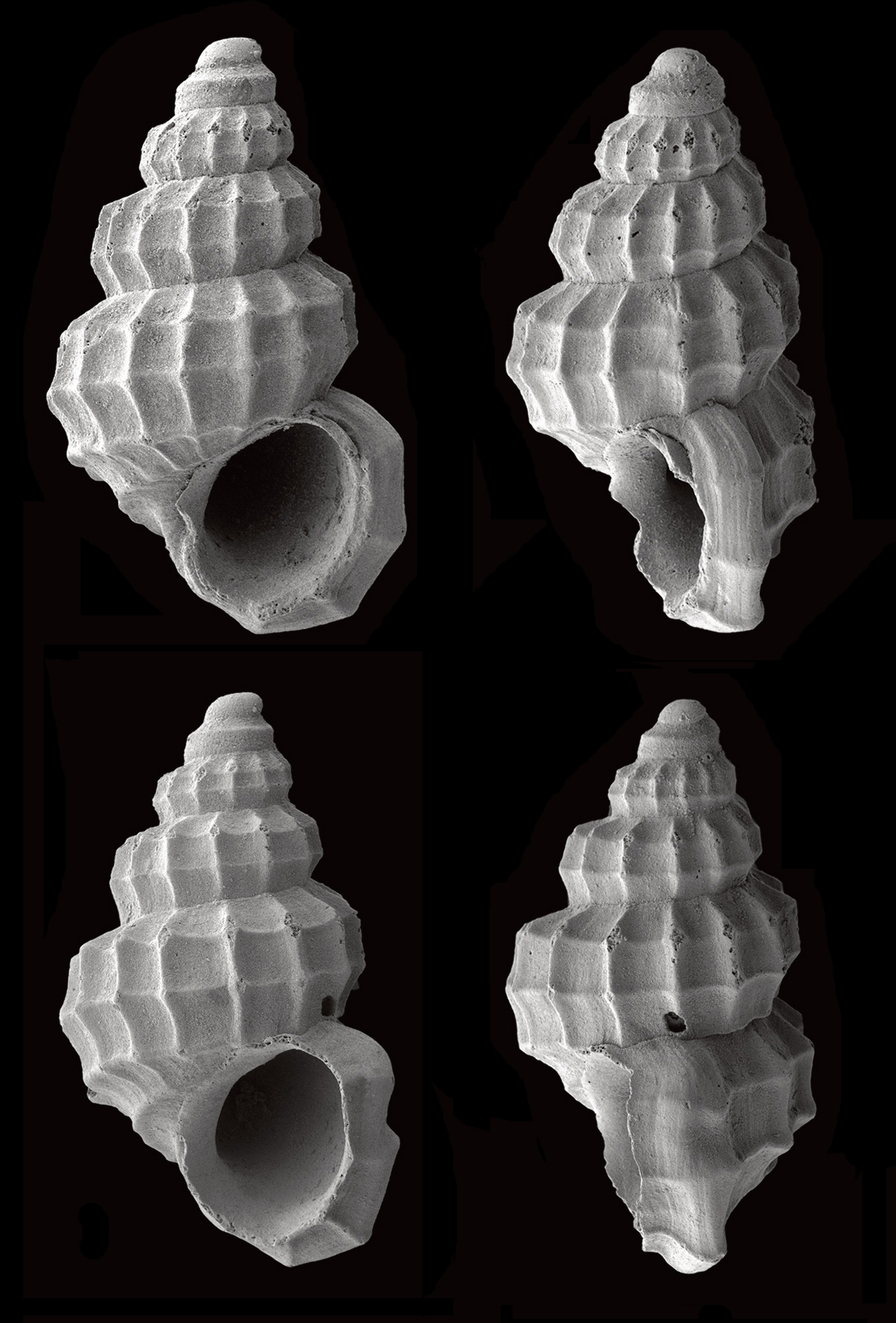
- Shell of Alvania templadoi (paratype at MNHN, Paris)

Scientific classification
- Kingdom: Animalia
- Phylum: Mollusca
- Class: Gastropoda
- Subclass: Caenogastropoda
- Order: Littorinimorpha
- Superfamily: Rissooidea
- Family: Rissoidae
- Genus: Alvania
- Species: A. templadoi

Binomial name
- Alvania templadoi Hoffman & Freiwald, 2021

= Alvania templadoi =

Species of gastropod

Alvania templadoi is a species of minute sea snail, a marine gastropod mollusc or micromollusc in the family Rissoidae.

== Distribution ==
This species is found in the Atlantic Ocean on seamounts near the Azores.
