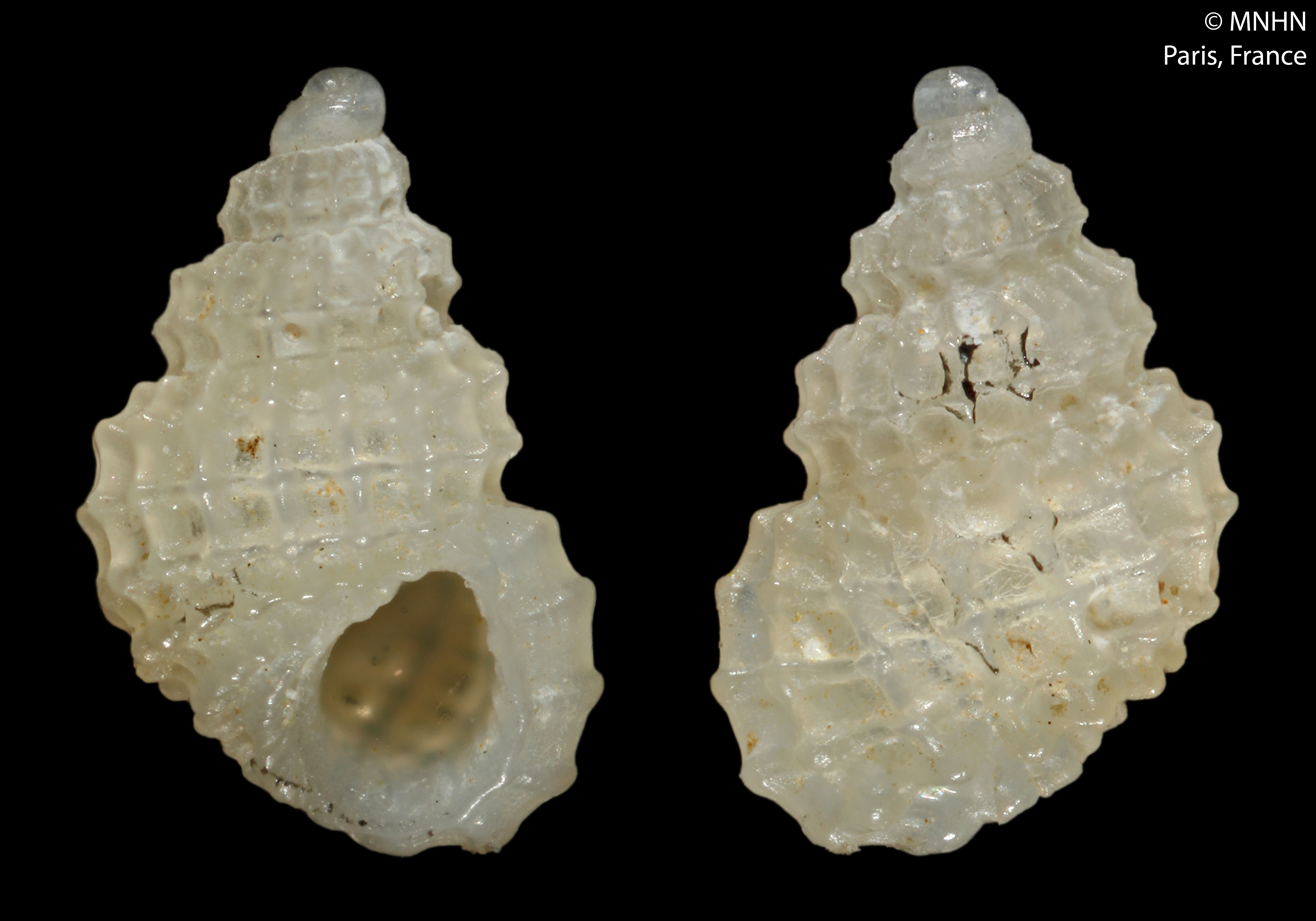
- Shell of Alvania oetyliaca (holotype ayt MNHN, Paris)

Scientific classification
- Kingdom: Animalia
- Phylum: Mollusca
- Class: Gastropoda
- Subclass: Caenogastropoda
- Order: Littorinimorpha
- Superfamily: Rissooidea
- Family: Rissoidae
- Genus: Alvania
- Species: A. oetyliaca

Binomial name
- Alvania oetyliaca Amati & Chiarelli, 2017

= Alvania oetyliaca =

Species of gastropod

Alvania oetyliaca is a species of small sea snail, a marine gastropod mollusk or micromollusk in the family Rissoidae.

== Description ==
The length of the shell attains 2.1 mm, its diameter is 1.35 mm.

== Distribution ==
This species occurs in the Mediterranean Sea off Greece and Turkey.
