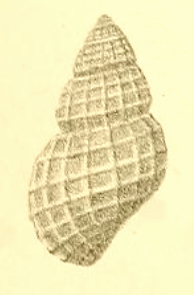
- Shell of Alvania aglaja (holotype)

Scientific classification
- Kingdom: Animalia
- Phylum: Mollusca
- Class: Gastropoda
- Subclass: Caenogastropoda
- Order: Littorinimorpha
- Superfamily: Rissooidea
- Family: Rissoidae
- Genus: Alvania
- Species: †A. aglaja

Binomial name
- †Alvania aglaja De Stefani & Pantanelli, 1888

= Alvania aglaja =

Species of gastropod

Alvania aglaja is an extinct species of minute sea snail, a marine gastropod mollusc or micromollusk in the family Rissoidae.

== Description ==
The length of the shell attains 4.3 mm, its diameter 2 mm.

== Distribution ==
Fossils of this marine species were found in Pliocene strata off Siena in Italy
