= Alvania lachesis =

Scientific classification
- Kingdom: Animalia
- Phylum: Mollusca
- Class: Gastropoda
- Subclass: Caenogastropoda
- Order: Littorinimorpha
- Superfamily: Rissooidea
- Family: Rissoidae
- Genus: Alvania
- Species: †A. lachesis

Binomial name
- †Alvania lachesis (Basterot, 1825)

Synonyms
- † Rissoa lachesis (Basterot, 1825) (Alvania accepted as full genus); † Rissoa lachesis var. mayeri De Stefani & Pantanelli, 1888 junior subjective synonym; † Turbo lachesis Basterot, 1825

Extinct species of gastropod

Alvania lachesis is an extinct species of minute sea snail, a marine gastropod mollusc or micromollusk in the family Rissoidae.

== Distribution ==
Fossils of this marine species were found in Miocene strata in Loir-et-Cher, France; also in Austria.
