= Alvania dingdensis =

Scientific classification
- Kingdom: Animalia
- Phylum: Mollusca
- Class: Gastropoda
- Subclass: Caenogastropoda
- Order: Littorinimorpha
- Superfamily: Rissooidea
- Family: Rissoidae
- Genus: Alvania
- Species: †A. dingdensis

Binomial name
- †Alvania dingdensis (A. W. Janssen, 1967)

Synonyms
- † Pseudalvania dingdensis A. W. Janssen, 1967 (Pseudalvania synonymized with Alvania)

Species of gastropod

Alvania dingdensis is an extinct species of minute sea snail, a marine gastropod mollusk or micromollusk in the family Rissoidae.

== Distribution ==
Fossils were found in Miocene strata near Dingden, North Rhine-Westphalia, Germany.
