= Alvania scuderii =

Scientific classification
- Kingdom: Animalia
- Phylum: Mollusca
- Class: Gastropoda
- Subclass: Caenogastropoda
- Order: Littorinimorpha
- Superfamily: Rissooidea
- Family: Rissoidae
- Genus: Alvania
- Species: A. scuderii

Binomial name
- Alvania scuderii Villari, 2017

Species of gastropod

Alvania scuderii is a species of minute sea snail, marine gastropod mollusk or micromollusk in the family Rissoidae.

== Distribution ==
This marine species occurs in the Mediterranean Sea off Sicily

== Description ==
The maximum recorded shell length is 2.1 mm.
