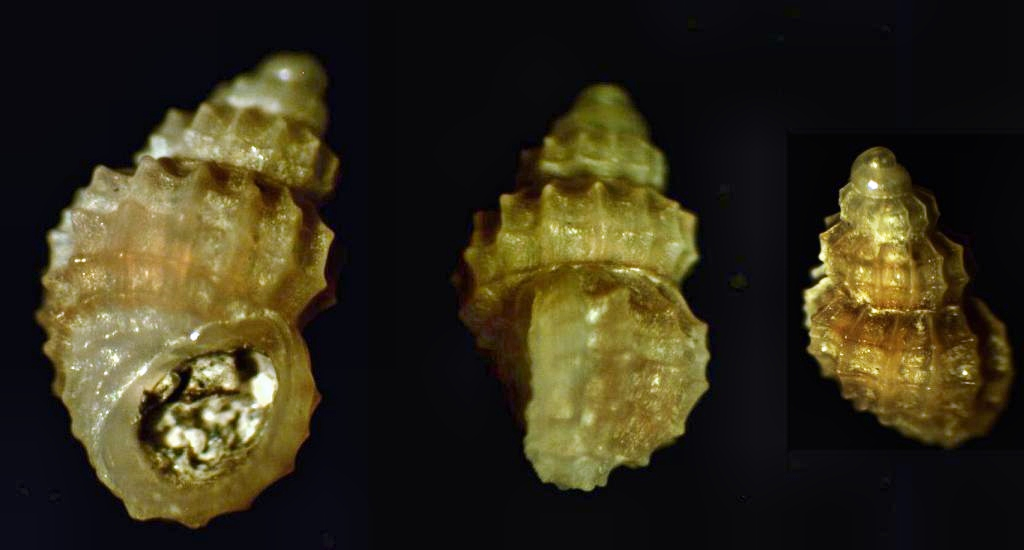
- Alvania clathrella

Scientific classification
- Kingdom: Animalia
- Phylum: Mollusca
- Class: Gastropoda
- Subclass: Caenogastropoda
- Order: Littorinimorpha
- Superfamily: Rissooidea
- Family: Rissoidae
- Genus: Alvania; Risso, 1826

Type species
- Alvania europea Risso, 1826

Species
- See text

Synonyms
- Acinopsis Monterosato, 1884; Acinulus Monterosato [in Seguenza], 1903; Acinus Monterosato, 1884; Actonia Monterosato, 1884; Alcidia Monterosato, 1890 † (invalid: junior homonym of Alcidia Westwood, 1879 [Lepidoptera]; Alcidiella is a replacement name); Alcidiella Cossmann, 1921 †; Alvanea (incorrect subsequent spelling); Alvania (Acinulus) Seguenza, 1903 (Not sufficiently different from Alvania s.s.); Alvania (Alvanolira) F. Nordsieck, 1972; Alvania (Alvinia) Monterosato, 1884; Alvania (Coronalvania) F. Nordsieck, 1972; Alvania (Lanciella) F. Nordsieck, 1972; Alvania (Linemera) Finlay, 1924; Alvania (Moniziella) F. Nordsieck, 1972; Alvania (Willetia) (incorrect subsequent spelling); Alvania (Willettia) Gordon, 1939 (Willettia synonymized with Alvania); Alvaniella Monterosato [in Sacco], 1895; Alvanolira F. Nordsieck, 1972; Alvinia Monterosato, 1884; Alvinia (Conalvinia) Ponder, 1967; Alvinia (Linemera) Finlay, 1924; Ameririssoa Ponder, 1985; Arsenia Monterosato, 1891; Conalvinia Ponder, 1967; Flemellia Nordsieck, 1972; Galeodina Monterosato, 1884; Linemera Finlay, 1924; Manzonia (Alvinia) Monterosato, 1884; Manzonia (Andrewiella) F. Nordsieck, 1972; Massotia Bucquoy, Dautzenberg & Dollfus, 1884; Moniziella Nordsieck, 1972; Profundialvania Taviani, 1975; Pseudalvania R. Janssen, 1967; Pusillina (Ameririssoa) Ponder, 1985; Rissoa (Alvania); (Alvinia) Monterosato, 1884; Rissoa (Galeodina) Monterosato, 1884; Rissoia (Alvania) Risso, 1826; Thapsia Monterosato, 1884 (invalid: junior homonym of Thapsia Albers, 1860; Thapsiella is a replacement name); Thapsiella P. Fischer, 1885; Turbona Leach [in Gray], 1847; Turbona (Massotiella) F. Nordsieck, 1972; Zacanthusa Leach, 1852

= Alvania =

Genus of gastropods

Alvania is a genus of minute sea snails, marine gastropod mollusks or micromollusks in the family Rissoidae.

They form a very diversified group within the Rissoidae family.

== Description ==
Alvania as currently used may not be monophyletic.

The genus Alvinia has been synonymized with Alvania, until a consistent phylogenetic scheme emerges for the whole group. As of 2012, is sometimes considered a separate genus.

The genus Alvania comprises species with small shells with heights measuring between 1 mm and 7 mm. Their general shape is ovate-conical, reticulated with axial and spirals elements. They have a continuous peristome. Their coloration is variable.

Some species such as Alvania sculptilis have been named twice with the second naming becoming a junior secondary homonym. However, the genus Alvania as currently used has a very broad taxonomic extension, and these species may very well end up in different genera when a robust phylogeny becomes available.

== Distribution ==
These marine species can be found worldwide (except in the antarctic and subantarctic regions). They can be found from intertidal depths to abyssal depths.

== Species ==
Species within the genus Alvania include:

- Alvania aartseni Verduin, 1986
- Alvania abrupta Dell, 1956
- Alvania abstersa van der Linden & van Aartsen, 1993
- † Alvania absuturalis Chirli & Forli, 2021
- Alvania acida Garilli, Reitano & Scuderi, 2023
- † Alvania acuticarinata Landau, Ceulemans & Van Dingenen, 2018
- † Alvania acutissimispira Landau, Amati & Harzhauser, 2025
- Alvania adiaphoros Bouchet & Warén, 1993
- Alvania adinogramma Bouchet & Warén, 1993
- Alvania aeoliae Palazzi, 1988
- Alvania aequisculpta Keep, 1887
- Alvania africana Gofas, 1999
- † Alvania agathae Reitano, Cresti & Di Franco, 2020
- † Alvania aglaja De Stefani & Pantanelli in De Stefani, 1888
- Alvania akibai Yokoyama, 1926
- Alvania albachiarae Perugia, 2021
- Alvania alboranensis Peñas & Rolán, 2006
- † Alvania alexandrae O. Boettger, 1902
- † Alvania alfredbelli Faber, 2017
- Alvania algeriana Monterosato, 1877
- Alvania aliceae Amati, 2014
- † Alvania allixi Cossmann, 1919
- Alvania almo Bartsch, 1911
- † Alvania alta Bałuk, 1975
- Alvania amatii Oliverio, 1986
- † Alvania ameliae Chirli & Forli, 2021
- † Alvania amoena Tabanelli, Bongiardino & Perugia, 2011
- † Alvania amphitrite Thivaiou, Harzhauser & Koskeridou, 2019
- † Alvania ampulla Eichwald, 1853
- † Alvania anabaptizata Boettger, 1906
- Alvania angioyi van Aartsen, 1982
- Alvania angularis Warén, 1996
- † Alvania angusticostata Traub, 1981
- Alvania annetteae Amati, Danzelle & Devauchelle, 2018
- Alvania annobonensis Rolán, 2004
- † Alvania antwerpiensis Glibert, 1952
- † Alvania aquensis Grateloup, 1838
- † Alvania areolifera Sandberger, 1863
- Alvania argentea G.B. Sowerby III, 1892
- † Alvania argillensis Lozouet, 1998
- †Alvania armata Landau, Ceulemans & Van Dingenen, 2018
- Alvania arubensis De Jong & Coomans, 1988
- Alvania aspera Philippi, 1844
- Alvania asperula Brugnone, 1880
- † Alvania asphaltodus Beets, 1942
- † Alvania aturensis Lozouet, 1998
- Alvania auberiana d'Orbigny, 1842
- Alvania aupouria Powell, 1937
- Alvania aurantiaca Watson, 1873
- Alvania awa Chinzei, 1959
- † Alvania awamoaensis H. J. Finlay, 1924
- † Alvania axistriata L. Hoffman & C. Little, 2025
- †Alvania babylonelliformis Gürs in Gürs & Spiegler, 1999
- † Alvania baldoi Garilli & Parrinello, 2011
- Alvania balearica Oliver & Templado, 2009
- Alvania bangkaensis Amati & Perugia, 2026
- † Alvania barreti Morlet, 1885
- Alvania bartolinorum Amati & Smriglio, 2019
- † Alvania bartschi Olsson, 1942
- † Alvania basisulcata A. W. Janssen, 1972
- Alvania beanii Hanley in Thorpe, 1844
- † Alvania belgica Glibert, 1952
- † Alvania belli Harmer, 1920
- Alvania bermudensis Faber & Moolenbeek, 1987
- Alvania beyersi Thiele, 1925
- † Alvania beyrichii Bosquet, 1859
- † Alvania bicingulata G. Seguenza, 1876
- † Alvania bicingulina Landau, Amati & Harzhauser, 2025
- † Alvania bonellii Palazzi, 1996
- † Alvania bonneti Cossmann, 1921
- Alvania bounteyensis Dell, 1950
- Alvania boutani Dautzenberg & Fischer, 1907
- Alvania boyeri Amati & Renda, 2025
- Alvania bozcaadensis Tisselli & Giunchi, 2013
- † Alvania braillonis Le Renard, 1990
- † Alvania brusinai Schwartz von Mohrenstern in Brusina, 1877
- † Alvania burtoni Glibert, 1962
- †Alvania butonensis Beets, 1942
- Alvania cabrensis Rolán & Hernández, 2007
- † Alvania calasi Van Dingenen, Ceulemans & Landau, 2016
- † Alvania calliope Chirli & U. Linse, 2011
- Alvania campanii Tisselli & Giunchi, 2013
- Alvania campta Dall, 1927
- Alvania canariensis d'Orbigny, 1840
- Alvania cancapae Bouchet & Warén, 1993
- Alvania cancellata da Costa, 1778
- Alvania candasae J. D. Oliver & Gofas, 2022
- Alvania canonica Dall, 1927
- † Alvania caporalii Chirli, 2006
- Alvania carinata da Costa, 1778
- † Alvania cathyae Landau, Marquet & Grigis, 2003
- † Alvania cerreti Gardella, Bertaccini, Bertamini, Bongiardino, Petracci & Tabanelli, 2021
- † Alvania chilensis Philippi, 1887
- Alvania cimex Linnaeus, 1758
- † Alvania cimicoiberica Landau, Amati & Harzhauser, 2025
- Alvania cimicoides Forbes, 1844
- † Alvania cioppii Chirli, 2006
- Alvania clarae Nofroni & Pizzini, 1991
- Alvania clathrella Seguenza L., 1903
- Alvania claudioi Buzzurro & Landini, 2007
- † Alvania coccoi G. Seguenza, 1876
- Alvania colossophilus Oberling, 1970
- Alvania compacta Carpenter, 1864
- Alvania concinna A. Adams, 1861
- † Alvania conica Schwartz von Mohrenstern, 1867
- † Alvania convexispira O. Boettger, 1906
- Alvania corneti Hoenselaar & Goud, 1998
- Alvania corona Nordsieck, 1972
- Alvania coseli Gofas, 1999
- Alvania cosmia Bartsch, 1911
- † Alvania cossmanni Harmer, 1920
- † Alvania couffoni Landau, Ceulemans & Van Dingenen, 2018
- Alvania cranchiana Leach, 1852
- † Alvania crassistriata S. V. Wood, 1848
- † Alvania craticula Briart & Cornet, 1887
- † Alvania critica Boettger, 1907
- Alvania cruzi Castellanos & Fernández, 1974
- Alvania crystallina Garrett, 1873
- Alvania curacaoensis De Jong & Coomans, 1988
- † Alvania curta Dujardin, 1837
- † Alvania daguini Peyrot, 1938
- Alvania dalmatica Buzzurro & Prkic, 2007
- Alvania datchaensis Amati & Oliverio, 1987
- † Alvania dautzenbergi Glibert, 1949
- Alvania debruynei Faber & Moolenbeek, 2004
- Alvania dejongi Faber & Moolenbeek, 2004
- Alvania denhartogi Hoenselaar & Goud, 1998
- † Alvania densecostata Harmer, 1920
- Alvania desabatae Amati & Smriglio, 2016
- Alvania deweti Thiele, 1925
- † Alvania diadema De Stefani & Pantanelli in De Stefani, 1888
- Alvania dianiensis Oliverio, 1988
- Alvania dictyophora Philippi, 1844
- Alvania dijkstrai Hoenselaar & Goud, 1998
- † Alvania dimitrii Garilli & Parrinello, 2010
- † Alvania dingdensis A. W. Janssen, 1967
- Alvania dipacoi Giusti Fr. & Nofroni, 1989
- Alvania discazalorum Lozouet, 1998 †
- Alvania discors Allan, 1818
- Alvania disparilis Monterosato, 1890
- † Alvania dissensia Van Dingenen, Ceulemans & Landau, 2016
- Alvania distincta W. H. Turton, 1932
- † Alvania doliolum Lozouet, 2015
- †Alvania dollfusi Cossmann & Pissarro, 1902
- Alvania dorbignyi Audouin, 1826
- † Alvania dubia G. Seguenza, 1876
- † Alvania dubiosa Harmer, 1920
- † Alvania dumasi Cossmann, 1899
- Alvania electa Monterosato, 1874
- Alvania elegantissima Monterosato, 1875
- Alvania elenae Gofas, 2007
- Alvania elisae Margelli, 2001
- † Alvania ellae Boettger, 1901
- Alvania emaciata Mörch, 1876
- † Alvania enysii Bell, 1898
- † Alvania erato Chirli & U. Linse, 2011
- † Alvania erecta Harmer, 1920
- † Alvania erentoezae İslamoğlu, 2006
- Alvania esmes Manousis, J. D. Oliver & Zaminos, 2023
- Alvania euchila Watson, 1886
- Alvania eucraspeda Hedley, 1911
- † Alvania euphrosine De Stefani & Pantanelli in De Stefani, 1888
- † Alvania eurydictium Cossmann, 1888
- Alvania exserta Suter, 1908
- Alvania faberi De Jong & Coomans, 1988
- † Alvania falsivenus Lozouet, 2015
- † Alvania falunica Peyrot, 1938
- Alvania fasciata Tenison Woods, 1876
- Alvania fenestrata Krauss, 1848
- † Alvania fezata Landau, Ceulemans & Van Dingenen, 2018
- Alvania filocincta Hedley & Petterd, 1906
- Alvania fischeri Jeffreys, 1884
- Alvania flava Okutani, 1964
- Alvania flexicostata Amati & Perugia, 2026
- Alvania flexilis Gofas, 1999
- † Alvania foraminata Lozouet, 1998
- Alvania formicarum Gofas, 1989
- Alvania fractospira Oberling, 1970
- † Alvania francescoi Garilli, 2008
- Alvania franseni Hoenselaar & Goud, 1998
- † Alvania frediani Della Bella & Scarponi, 2000
- Alvania freitasi Segers, Swinnen & De Prins, 2009
- † Alvania frigida Cossmann, 1921
- Alvania fulgens W. H. Turton, 1932
- Alvania funiculata Gofas, 2007
- † Alvania galeodinopsis Le Renard, 1990
- Alvania gallegosi Baker, Hanna & Strong, 1930
- Alvania gallinacea Finlay, 1930
- Alvania garrafensis Peñas & Rolán, 2008
- Alvania gascoignei Rolán, 2001
- Alvania gemina Rolán & Hernández, 2007
- † Alvania gemmulata G. Seguenza, 1876
- Alvania geryonia Nardo, 1847
- † Alvania giselae Boettger, 1901
- Alvania glabra Leach, 1852
- † Alvania globosa Landau, Ceulemans & Van Dingenen, 2018
- Alvania gofasi Rolán & Fernandes, 1990
- † Alvania gontsharovae Iljina, 1993
- † Alvania gourbesvillensis Cossmann, 1921
- Alvania gradatoides Finlay, 1930
- Alvania grancanariensis Segers, 1999
- † Alvania granosa Tabanelli, Bongiardino & Perugia, 2011
- Alvania guancha Moolenbeek & Hoenselaar, 1989
- † Alvania gutta Tabanelli, Bongiardino & Perugia, 2011
- Alvania halia Bartsch, 1911
- Alvania hallgassi Amati & Oliverio, 1985
- Alvania harrietae Segers, Swinnen & De Prins, 2009
- †Alvania hauniensis Ravn, 1939
- Alvania hedleyi Thiele, 1930
- † Alvania helenae Boettger, 1901
- † Alvania heraelaciniae Ruggieri, 1950
- Alvania herosaeAmati, Di Giulio & Oliverio, 2023
- Alvania herwigia Castellanos & Fernández, 1974
- † Alvania hinschi Gürs & Weinbrecht, 2001
- Alvania hirta Monterosato, 1884
- † Alvania hispanica Landau, Amati & Harzhauser, 2025
- Alvania hispidula Monterosato, 1884
- Alvania hoeksemai Hoenselaar & Goud, 1998
- †Alvania holsatica Anderson, 1960
- † Alvania holubicensis Friedberg, 1923
- † Alvania houdasi Cossmann, 1907
- Alvania hueti Bozzetti, 2017
- † Alvania hungarica Bohn-Havas, 1973
- Alvania hyerensis Gofas, 2007
- † Alvania iberopliocenica Landau, Amati & Harzhauser, 2025
- Alvania ignota Cecalupo & Perugia, 2009
- Alvania ima Bartsch, 1911
- Alvania imperspicua Pallary, 1920
- Alvania incognita Warén, 1996
- Alvania inflata W. H. Turton, 1932
- † Alvania insulsa Landau, Ceulemans & Van Dingenen, 2018
- Alvania internodula Hoenselaar & Goud, 1998
- † Alvania interrupta Finlay, 1924
- † Alvania ismar Amati, Taviani & Oliverio, 2024
- Alvania isolata Laseron, 1956
- Alvania jacquesi Hoenselaar & Goud, 1998
- Alvania jeffreysi Waller, 1864
- Alvania johannae Moolenbeek & Hoenselaar, 1998
- Alvania joseae Hoenselaar & Goud, 1998
- Alvania josefoi Oliver & Templado, 2009
- † Alvania josephineae Landau, Ceulemans & Van Dingenen, 2018
- † Alvania kaawaensis Laws, 1940
- † Alvania kenneyi Ladd, 1966
- Alvania kermadecensis Oliver, 1915
- † Alvania kowalewskii Bałuk, 1975
- Alvania kowiensis Tomlin, 1931
- Alvania kwandangensis Schepman, 1909
- † Alvania lachesis Basterot, 1825
- † Alvania lachrimula Landau, Ceulemans & Van Dingenen, 2018
- † Alvania lachrymiformis Landau, Amati & Harzhauser, 2025
- † Alvania lactanea Glibert, 1949
- Alvania lactea Michaud, 1832
- †Alvania lagouardensis Lozouet & Maestrati, 1982
- Alvania lamellata Dautzenberg, 1889
- Alvania lampra Dall, 1927
- Alvania lanciae Calcara, 1845
- † Alvania laufensis Traub, 1981
- † Alvania laurae Brunetti & Vecchi, 2012
- Alvania lavaleyei Hoenselaar & Goud, 1998
- Alvania leacocki Watson, 1873
- †Alvania leopardiana Brunetti & Vecchi, 2012
- Alvania letourneuxi Amati, Di Giulio & Oliverio, 2023
- Alvania liesjeae Segers, Swinnen & De Prins, 2009
- † Alvania ligeriana Peyrot, 1938
- Alvania limensis Ponder & Worsfold, 1994
- Alvania lineata Risso, 1826
- Alvania litoralis Nordsieck, 1972
- † Alvania littorinoides Cossmann, 1921
- † Alvania lobilloensis Landau, Amati & Harzhauser, 2025
- Alvania lucinae Oberling, 1970
- Alvania macandrewi Manzoni, 1868
- Alvania macella Gofas, 2007
- Alvania maclurgi Powell, 1933
- Alvania mamillata Risso, 1826
- Alvania marchadi Gofas, 1999
- † Alvania mariae A. d'Orbigny, 1852
- Alvania marioi Gofas, 1999
- Alvania marmarisensis Bitlis & Öztürk, 2017
- Alvania masirahensis Perugia, 2021
- † Alvania maurizioi Chirli, 2006
- Alvania maximilicutiani Scuderi, 2014
- Alvania mediolittoralis Gofas, 1989
- Alvania meridioamericana Weisbord, 1962
- † Alvania merlei Van Dingenen, Ceulemans & Landau, 2016
- † Alvania micalii Chirli, 2006
- Alvania microglypta Haas, 1943
- Alvania micropilosa Gofas, 2007
- Alvania microstriata Hoenselaar & Goud, 1998
- Alvania microtuberculata Gofas, 2007
- † Alvania milleti Landau, Ceulemans & Van Dingenen, 2018
- †Alvania milletispinosa Landau, Ceulemans & Van Dingenen, 2018
- Alvania minuscula Verrill & Bush, 1900
- † Alvania minuta Finlay, 1924
- † Alvania miocalasi Landau, Ceulemans & Van Dingenen, 2018
- † Alvania miolactea Landau, Ceulemans & Van Dingenen, 2018
- Alvania moerchi Collin, 1886
- Alvania moniziana Watson, 1873
- Alvania monserratensis Baker, Hanna & Strong, 1930
- † Alvania montensis Glibert, 1973
- † Alvania monterosatoi P. Fischer, 1877
- Alvania moolenbeeki De Jong & Coomans, 1988
- † Alvania morleti Le Renard, 1990
- Alvania multinodula Hoenselaar & Goud, 1998
- Alvania multiquadrata van der Linden & Wagner, 1989
- † Alvania multistriata Bell, 1892
- † Alvania napoleoni Landau, Ceulemans & Van Dingenen, 2018
- Alvania nemo Bartsch, 1911
- Alvania nestaresi Oliverio & Amati, 1990
- Alvania nicobarica Thiele, 1925
- Alvania nicolauensis Moolenbeek & Rolán, 1988
- Alvania nihonkaiensis Hasegawa, 2014
- Alvania nina Faber, 2010
- † Alvania nitida Brunetti & Vecchi, 2012
- Alvania nix Poppe, Tagaro & Goto, 2018
- Alvania nonsculpta Hoenselaar & Goud, 1998
- Alvania novarensis Frauenfeld, 1867
- † Alvania obeliscus Harmer, 1920
- † Alvania obliquicostata H. Wang, 1981
- Alvania occidua Cotton, 1944
- † Alvania oceani d'Orbigny, 1852
- Alvania oetyliaca Amati & Chiarelli, 2017
- Alvania ogasawarana Pilsbry, 1904
- † Alvania ohleorum R. Janssen & G. Stein, 2025
- Alvania oldroydae Bartsch, 1911
- Alvania oliverioi Buzzurro, 2003
- Alvania paatsi Hoenselaar & Goud, 1998
- Alvania pagodula Bucquoy, Dautzenberg & Dollfus, 1884
- † Alvania pagodulina Sacco, 1895
- †Alvania parasusieae Landau, Ceulemans & Van Dingenen, 2018
- † Alvania parazosta Lozouet, 1998
- † Alvania pariana Guppy in Guppy & Dall, 1896
- † Alvania partimcancellata Harmer, 1920
- † Alvania partschi Hörnes, 1856
- Alvania parvimaculata Amati, Di Giulio & Oliverio, 2023
- Alvania parvula Jeffreys, 1884
- Alvania peli Moolenbeek & Rolán, 1988
- Alvania peloritana Aradas & Benoit, 1874
- † Alvania perregularis Sacco, 1895
- Alvania perugia Amati, 2026
- Alvania perversa F. Nordsieck, 1972
- Alvania pettinellii Amati, 2024
- † Alvania peyreirensis Cossmann & Peyrot, 1919
- Alvania piersmai Moolenbeek & Hoenselaar, 1989
- Alvania pilipina Amati & Perugia, 2026
- Alvania pinguis Webster, 1906
- Alvania pinguoides Powell, 1940
- Alvania pizzinii Amati, Smriglio & Oliverio, 2020
- Alvania planciusi Moolenbeek & Rolán, 1988
- † Alvania planicincta Le Renard, 1990
- Alvania platycephala Dautzenberg & Fischer H., 1896
- † Alvania playagrandensis Weisbord, 1962
- † Alvania pluricosticillata Chirli & Forli, 2021
- Alvania porcupinae Gofas & Warén, 1982
- Alvania portentosa Rolán & Hernández, 2007
- Alvania poucheti Dautzenberg, 1889
- † Alvania praeholsatica Gürs & Weinbrecht, 2001
- † Alvania praenovarensis Ludbrook, 1956
- † Alvania praetermissa Landau, Van Dingenen & Ceulemans, 2023
- † Alvania proavia Pilsbry & C. W. Johnson, 1917
- † Alvania productilis Boettger, 1906
- Alvania profundicola Bartsch, 1911
- Alvania prosocostata Amati, Di Giulio & Oliverio, 2023
- Alvania prusi P. Fischer, 1877
- † Alvania pseudalvania Andrusov, 1905
- Alvania pseudoareolata Warén, 1974
- † Alvania pseudohispidula Brunetti & Vecchi, 2012
- † Alvania pseudopartschi H.-J. Anderson, 1960
- Alvania pseudosyngenes Warén, 1973
- † Alvania pukeuriensis Finlay, 1924
- † Alvania pulcherrima Peyrot, 1938
- Alvania punctura Montagu, 1803
- Alvania purpurea Dall, 1871
- † Alvania putei Lozouet & Maestrati, 1982
- Alvania quadrata A. A. Gould, 1861
- † Alvania raulini Cossmann & Peyrot, 1919
- † Alvania redoniana Landau, Ceulemans & Van Dingenen, 2018
- Alvania regina Gofas, 1999
- † Alvania renauleauensis Landau, Ceulemans & Van Dingenen, 2018
- Alvania renei Hoenselaar & Goud, 1998
- † Alvania reticulatopunctata Seguenza, 1879
- Alvania richeri Gofas, 1999
- † Alvania riparia Lozouet, 1998
- † Alvania rischi Gürs & Weinbrecht, 2001
- † Alvania robusta Calas, 1949
- Alvania rominae Amati, Trono & Oliverio, 2020
- Alvania rosana Bartsch, 1911
- † Alvania rosariae Garilli, 2008
- † Alvania rotulata Pantanelli, 1888
- Alvania rudis Philippi, 1844
- † Alvania rupeliensis Tembrock, 1964
- Alvania rykeli Hoenselaar & Goud, 1998
- † Alvania sacyi Cossmann, 1921
- Alvania salebrosa Frauenfeld, 1867
- † Alvania sanctipaulensis Lozouet, 1998
- Alvania scabra Philippi, 1844
- † Alvania schwartzi M. Hörnes, 1856
- Alvania schwartziana Brusina, 1866
- Alvania scrobiculata Møller, 1842
- Alvania scuderii Villari, 2017
- Alvania sculptilis Monterosato, 1877
- † Alvania seanlandaui Landau, Marquet & Grigis, 2003
- † Alvania seguenzorum Bertolaso & Palazzi, 2000
- Alvania seinensis Gofas, 2007
- † Alvania selsoifensis Bouchard, Wesselingh, Pouwer & Landau, 2025
- Alvania settepassii Amati & Nofroni, 1985
- † Alvania simonsi Marquet, 1997
- Alvania skylla Tisselli & Micali, 2023
- Alvania sleursi Amati, 1987
- Alvania slieringsi Hoenselaar & Goud, 1998
- Alvania solitaria Dell, 1956
- Alvania sombrerensis Thiele, 1925
- Alvania sororcula Granata-Grillo, 1877
- Alvania spinosa Monterosato, 1890
- † Alvania spirialis Glibert, 1949
- Alvania stenolopha Bouchet & Warén, 1993
- † Alvania stephanensis Lozouet, 1998
- Alvania stigmata Frauenfeld, 1867
- Alvania stocki Moolenbeek & Rolán, 1988
- Alvania strangei Brazier, 1894
- Alvania subareolata Monterosato, 1869
- Alvania subcalathus Dautzenberg & Fischer H., 1906
- † Alvania subclavata O. Boettger, 1906
- Alvania subcrenulata Bucquoy, Dautzenberg & Dollfus, 1884
- † Alvania subgaleodinopsis Lozouet, 2015
- † Alvania sublaevigata O. Boettger, 1906
- † Alvania sublagouardensis Lozouet, 1998
- Alvania subsoluta Aradas, 1847
- † Alvania subtiliangulosa Landau, Ceulemans & Van Dingenen, 2018
- Alvania subventricosa W. H. Turton, 1932
- Alvania suprasculpta May, 1915
- Alvania suroiti Gofas, 2007
- † Alvania susieae Landau, Ceulemans & Van Dingenen, 2018
- Alvania syngenes A. E. Verrill, 1884
- † Alvania tallahatchiensis (Sohl, 1961)
- Alvania taprobana Amati & Perugia, 2026
- Alvania tarsodes Watson, 1886
- † Alvania tauropraecedens Sacco, 1895
- Alvania templadoi Hoffman & Freiwald, 2021
- Alvania tenera Philippi, 1844
- Alvania tenhovei Hoenselaar & Goud, 1998
- † Alvania tenuicostata G. Seguenza, 1876
- † Alvania tenuisculpturata Landau, Ceulemans & Van Dingenen, 2018
- Alvania tessellata Weinkauff, 1868
- Alvania testae Aradas & Maggiore, 1844
- † Alvania textiliformis Harmer, 1920
- † Alvania thalia De Stefani & Pantanelli in De Stefani, 1888
- Alvania thouinensis May, 1915
- Alvania tomentosa Pallary, 1920
- † Alvania tongrorum Glibert & de Heinzelin de Braucourt, 1954
- Alvania townsendi Melvill, 1910
- Alvania trachisma Bartsch, 1911
- † Alvania transiens Sacco, 1895
- Alvania tumida Carpenter, 1857
- Alvania turkensis Faber & Moolenbeek, 2004
- † Alvania turtaudierei Landau, Ceulemans & Van Dingenen, 2018
- Alvania uapou Amati, Di Giulio & Oliverio, 2023
- Alvania unica Amati & Quaggiotto, 2019
- † Alvania urgonensis Cossmann, 1918
- Alvania valeriae Absalao, 1994
- † Alvania vandervalki Landau, Amati & Harzhauser, 2025
- Alvania vanegmondi Hoenselaar & Goud, 1998
- † Alvania varia Tabanelli, Bongiardino & Perugia, 2011
- † Alvania veleriniana Landau, Amati & Harzhauser, 2025
- † Alvania veliscensis Schwartz von Mohrenstern, 1867
- †Alvania venus d'Orbigny, 1852
- Alvania venusta Powell, 1926
- Alvania verconiana Hedley, 1911
- Alvania vermaasi van Aartsen, 1975
- Alvania verrilli Friele, 1886
- Alvania versoverana Melvill, 1910
- Alvania villarii Micali, Tisselli & Giunchi, 2005
- † Alvania villattae Le Renard, 1990
- †Alvania vinosula Anderson & Hanna, 1925
- † Alvania virodunensis Lozouet, 1998
- † Alvania waimamakuensis Laws, 1948
- † Alvania waisiuensis Beets, 1942
- Alvania wangi B.-Y. Xu, L. Qi & L.-F. Kong, 2022
- Alvania wareni Templado & Rolan, 1986
- Alvania watsoni Schwartz in Watson, 1873
- Alvania weinkauffi Weinkauff, 1868
- Alvania xelae J. D. Oliver & Urgorri, 2022
- Alvania yamatoensis Hasegawa, 2014
- Alvania zaraensis Amati & Appolloni, 2019
- † Alvania zbyszewskii Van Dingenen, Ceulemans & Landau, 2016
- Alvania zetlandica Montagu, 1815
- † Alvania zibinica Pantanelli, 1888
- † Alvania ziliolii Brunetti & Vecchi, 2012
- † Alvania ziziphina Dollfus in Calas, 1949
- Alvania zoderi Hoenselaar & Goud, 1998
- † Alvania zosta Bayan, 1873
- Alvania zylensis Gofas & Warén, 1982

Taxon inquirendum

- † Alvania rugosula Aradas, 1847
- Alvania scitula A. Adams, 1861
- Alvania semicostata A. Adams, 1861 (unassessed, use in recent literature not established by editor)
- Alvania subcancellata G. B. Sowerby III, 1894
- † Alvania sulzeriana Risso, 1826

== Synonyms ==
This is a long list
- Alvania aberrans (C. B. Adams, 1850): synonym of Stosicia aberrans (C. B. Adams, 1850)
- Alvania abyssicola (Forbes, 1850): synonym of Alvania testae (Aradas & Maggiore, 1844) (junior synonym )
- Alvania acutilirata (P. P. Carpenter, 1864): synonym of Alvania compacta (P. P. Carpenter, 1864)
- Alvania acuticostata (Dall, 1889): synonym of Benthonellania acuticostata (Dall, 1889)
- Alvania alaskana Dall, 1886: synonym of Onoba alaskana (Dall, 1886)
- Alvania albella S. V. Wood, 1842: synonym of Alvania ascaris (W. Turton, 1819) synonym of Aclis ascaris (W. Turton, 1819) (junior subjective synonym)
- Alvania albolirata (Carpenter, 1864): synonym of Lirobarleeia albolirata (Carpenter, 1864) (Does not belong to the genus Alvania)
- Alvania alfredensis Bartsch, 1915: synonym of Onoba alfredensis (Bartsch, 1915): synonym of Subestea alfredensis (Bartsch, 1915) (original combination)
- Alvania almo Bartsch, 1915: synonym of Alvania winslowae Bartsch, 1928 synonym of Cingula winslowae (Bartsch, 1928) (junior primary homonym of Alvania almo Bartsch, 1911)
- Alvania altenai van Aartsen, Menkhorst & Gittenberger, 1984: synonym of Alvania tomentosa (Pallary, 1920)
- † Alvania andraldensis Lozouet, 1998: synonym of † Simulamerelina andraldensis (Lozouet, 1998) (superseded combination)
- Alvania bakeri Bartsch, 1910: synonym of Onoba bakeri (Bartsch, 1910) (original combination)
- Alvania bartolomensis Bartsch, 1917: synonym of Lirobarleeia kelseyi (Dall & Bartsch, 1902)
- Alvania basteriae (Moolenbeek & Faber, 1986): synonym of Crisilla basteriae (Moolenbeek & Faber, 1986)
- † Alvania boucheti Lozouet, 1998: synonym of † Simulamerelina boucheti (Lozouet, 1998) (superseded combination)
- Alvania brocchii Weinkauff, 1868: synonym of Alvania reticulata (Montagu, 1803): synonym of Alvania beanii (Hanley, 1844)
- Alvania californica Bartsch, 1911: synonym of Alvania trachisma Bartsch, 1911
- Alvania carpenteri (Weinkauff, 1885): synonym of Onoba carpenteri (Weinkauff, 1885)
- Alvania chiriquiensis Olsson & McGinty, 1958: synonym of Lirobarleeia chiriquiensis (Olsson & McGinty, 1958)
- Alvania cingulata (Philippi, 1836): synonym of Alvania mamillata Risso, 1826
- Alvania clarionensis Bartsch, 1911: synonym of Lirobarleeia clarionensis (Bartsch, 1911) (original combination)
- Alvania colombiana Romer & Moore, 1988: synonym of Benthonellania colombiana (Romer & D. R. Moore, 1988) (original combination)
- Alvania consociella Monterosato, 1884: synonym of Alvania lanciae (Calcara, 1845)
- Alvania corayi Ladd, 1966: synonym of Clatrosansonia corayi (Ladd, 1966) (superseded combination)
- Alvania costulosa Risso, 1826: synonym of Alvania lineata Risso, 1826
- Alvania crassicostata Risso, 1826: synonym of Alvania discors (T. Brown, 1818)
- Alvania deliciosa (Jeffreys, 1884): synonym of Alvania electa (Monterosato, 1874)
- Alvania effusa P. P. Carpenter, 1857: synonym of Alabina effusa (P. P. Carpenter, 1857) (original combination)
- Alvania electrina (P. P. Carpenter, 1864): synonym of Lirobarleeia electrina (P. P. Carpenter, 1864)
- Alvania europea Risso, 1826: synonym of Alvania cimex (Linnaeus, 1758) (type by subsequent designation)
- Alvania excurvata Carpenter, 1857: synonym of Alabina excurvata (P. P. Carpenter, 1857) (original combination)
- † Alvania falsimerelina Lozouet, 1998: synonym of † Simulamerelina falsimerelina (Lozouet, 1998) (superseded combination)
- Alvania ferruginea A. Adams, 1861: synonym of Simulamerelina ferruginea (A. Adams, 1861)
- Alvania filosa P. P. Carpenter, 1864: synonym of Alvania compacta (P. P. Carpenter, 1864)
- Alvania firma (Laseron, 1956): synonym of Haurakia novarensis (Frauenfeld, 1867)
- Alvania formosita (Laseron, 1956): synonym of Haurakia novarensis (Frauenfeld, 1867)
- Alvania fossilis Bartsch, 1911: synonym of Alvania compacta (P. P. Carpenter, 1864)
- Alvania freminvillea Risso, 1826: synonym of Alvania cimex (Linnaeus, 1758)
- Alvania fusca Gould, 1861: synonym of Rissoina media Schwartz von Mohrenstern, 1860: synonym of Phosinella media (Schwartz von Mohrenstern, 1860) (junior subjective synonym)
- Alvania gagliniae Amati, 1985: synonym of Crisilla gagliniae (Amati, 1985)
- Alvania galapagensis Bartsch, 1911: synonym of Lirobarleeia galapagensis (Bartsch, 1911) (original combination)
- Alvania gradata (d'Orbigny, 1842): synonym of Lirobarleeia gradata (d'Orbigny, 1842)
- Alvania granti Strong, 1938: synonym of Lirobarleeia granti (Strong, 1938)
- † Alvania granulosculpta (L. Seguenza, 1903): synonym of † Alvania litoralis (F. Nordsieck, 1972) (dubious synonym)
- Alvania guesti Faber & Moolenbeek, 1987: synonym of Simulamerelina guesti (Faber & Moolenbeek, 1987)
- Alvania herrerae Baker, Hanna & Strong, 1930: synonym of Lirobarleeia herrerae (Baker, Hanna & Strong, 1930)
- Alvania hoodensis Bartsch, 1911: synonym of Lirobarleeia hoodensis (Bartsch, 1911) (original combination)
- † Alvania hortensis Lozouet, 1998: synonym of † Simulamerelina hortensis (Lozouet, 1998) (superseded combination)
- Alvania iliuliukensis Bartsch, 1911: synonym of Alvania compacta (P. P. Carpenter, 1864)
- Alvania lara Bartsch, 1911: synonym of Lirobarleeia lara (Bartsch, 1911)
- Alvania latior (Mighels & Adams, 1842): synonym of Setia latior (Mighels & C. B. Adams, 1842)
- Alvania lucasana Baker, Hanna & Strong, 1930: synonym of Lirobarleeia electrina (Carpenter, 1864)
- Alvania minuta (Golikov & Fedjakov in Scarlato, 1987): synonym of Punctulum minutum Golikov & Fedjakov, 1987
- Alvania montagui (Payraudeau, 1826): synonym of Alvania discors (T. Brown, 1818)
- Alvania montereyensis Bartsch, 1911: synonym of Onoba carpenteri (Weinkauff, 1885)
- Alvania novarensis Frauenfeld, 1867: synonym of Haurakia novarensis (Frauenfeld, 1867)
- Alvania obliqua Warén, 1974: synonym of Onoba obliqua (Warén, 1974)
- Alvania olivacea Frauenfeld, 1867: synonym of Pisinna olivacea (Frauenfeld, 1867)
- Alvania pedroana Bartsch, 1911: synonym of Alvania compacta (P. P. Carpenter, 1864)
- Alvania perlata Mörch, 1860: synonym of Lirobarleeia perlata (Mörch, 1860)
- Alvania pisinna Melvill & Standen, 1896: synonym of Merelina pisinna (Melvill & Standen, 1896)
- Alvania plicatula Risso, 1826: synonym of Rissoa membranacea (J. Adams, 1800)
- Alvania (Crisilla) postrema Gofas, 1990 : synonym of Crisilla postrema (Gofas, 1990)
- Alvania precipitata (Dall, 1889): synonym of Benthonellania precipitata (Dall, 1889)
- Alvania pyramidata Risso, 1826:synonym of Alvania cimex (Linnaeus, 1758)
- Alvania quadrasi O. Boettger, 1893: synonym of Iravadia quadrasi (O. Boettger, 1893)
- Alvania russinoniaca Locard, 1886: synonym of Alvania carinata (da Costa, 1778)
- Alvania sardea Risso, 1826: synonym of Alvania discors (T. Brown, 1818) (dubious synonym)
- Alvania semistriata (Montagu, 1808): synonym of Crisilla semistriata (Montagu, 1808)
- Alvania simulans Locard, 1886: synonym of Crisilla simulans (Locard, 1886)
- Alvania supranitida S.V. Wood, 1842: synonym of Aclis minor (Brown, 1827)
- † Alvania tiberiana (Coppi, 1876): synonym of † Galeodinopsis tiberiana (Coppi, 1876)
- Alvania trajectus (Watson, 1886): synonym of Haurakia novarensis (Frauenfeld, 1867)
- Alvania whitechurchi W. H. Turton, 1932: synonym of Cingula whitechurchi (W. H. Turton, 1932)
- Alvania wyvillethomsoni (Friele, 1877): synonym of Punctulum wyvillethomsoni (Friele, 1877)
