= Alvania critica =

Scientific classification
- Kingdom: Animalia
- Phylum: Mollusca
- Class: Gastropoda
- Subclass: Caenogastropoda
- Order: Littorinimorpha
- Superfamily: Rissooidea
- Family: Rissoidae
- Genus: Alvania
- Species: †A. critica

Binomial name
- †Alvania critica O. Boettger, 1907

Synonyms
- † Alvania helenae var. critica O. Boettger, 1907 (basionym)

Species of gastropod

Alvania critica is an extinct species of minute sea snail, a marine gastropod mollusk or micromollusk in the family Rissoidae.

== Description ==
The length of the shell attains 2.5 mm, its diameter 1.5 mm.

== Distribution ==
Fossils were found in the Miocene strata in Central Europe, Greece and Turkey.
