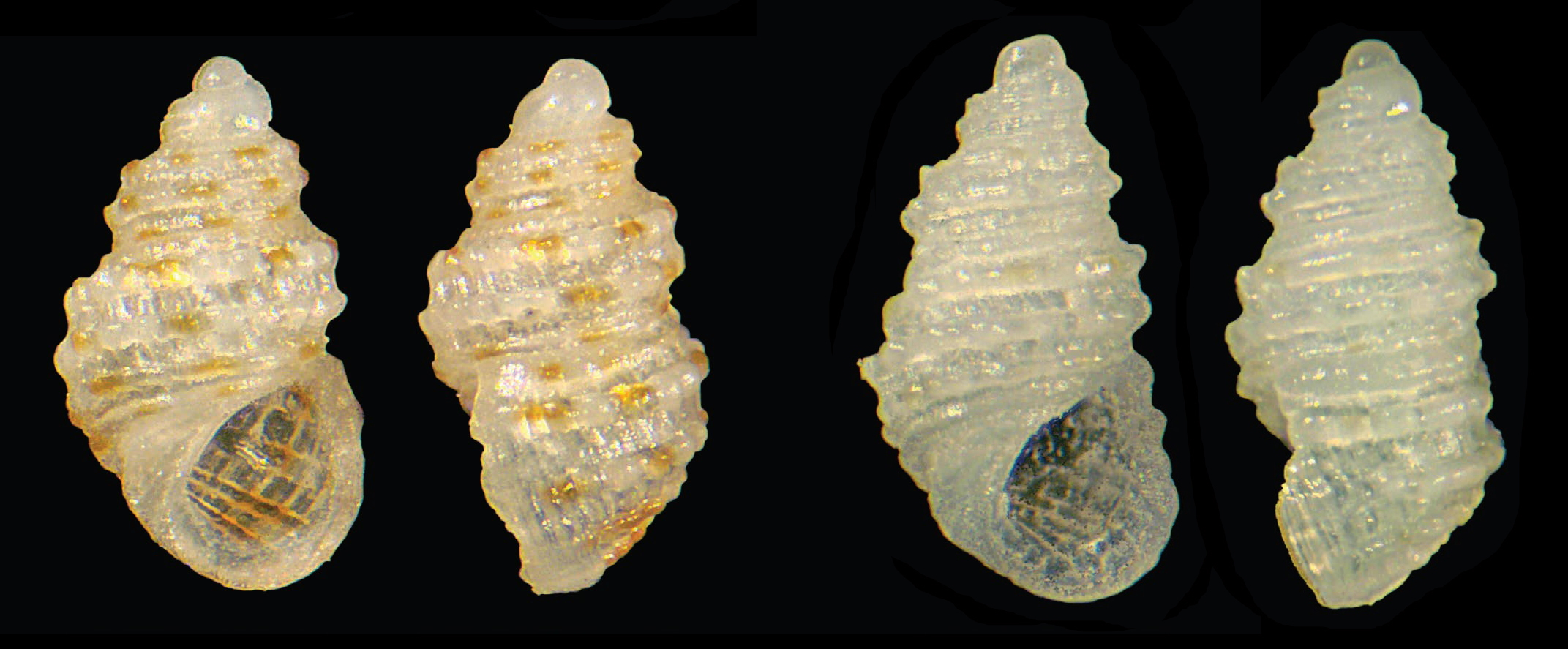
- Shell of Alvania parvimaculata (paratype at MNHN, Paris)

Scientific classification
- Kingdom: Animalia
- Phylum: Mollusca
- Class: Gastropoda
- Subclass: Caenogastropoda
- Order: Littorinimorpha
- Superfamily: Rissooidea
- Family: Rissoidae
- Genus: Alvania
- Species: A. parvimaculata

Binomial name
- Alvania parvimaculata Amati, Di Giulio & Oliverio, 2023

= Alvania parvimaculata =

Species of gastropod

Alvania parvimaculata is a species of minute sea snail, a marine gastropod mollusk or micromollusk in the family Rissoidae.

== Distribution ==
This species occurs off the Tuamotus, French Polynesia.
