= Alvania piersmai =

Scientific classification
- Kingdom: Animalia
- Phylum: Mollusca
- Class: Gastropoda
- Subclass: Caenogastropoda
- Order: Littorinimorpha
- Family: Rissoidae
- Genus: Alvania
- Species: A. piersmai

Binomial name
- Alvania piersmai Moolenbeek & Hoenselaar, 1989

Species of gastropod

Alvania piersmai is a species of minute sea snail, a marine gastropod mollusk or micromollusk in the family Rissoidae.

== Description ==
The size of the shell is 1.8 mm in length and 1.1 mm in width.

The protoconch of the shell has few turns. Its apex is smooth and forms 7–8 weaker spirals.

== Distribution ==
This species occurs in the Atlantic Ocean off the Canary Islands.
