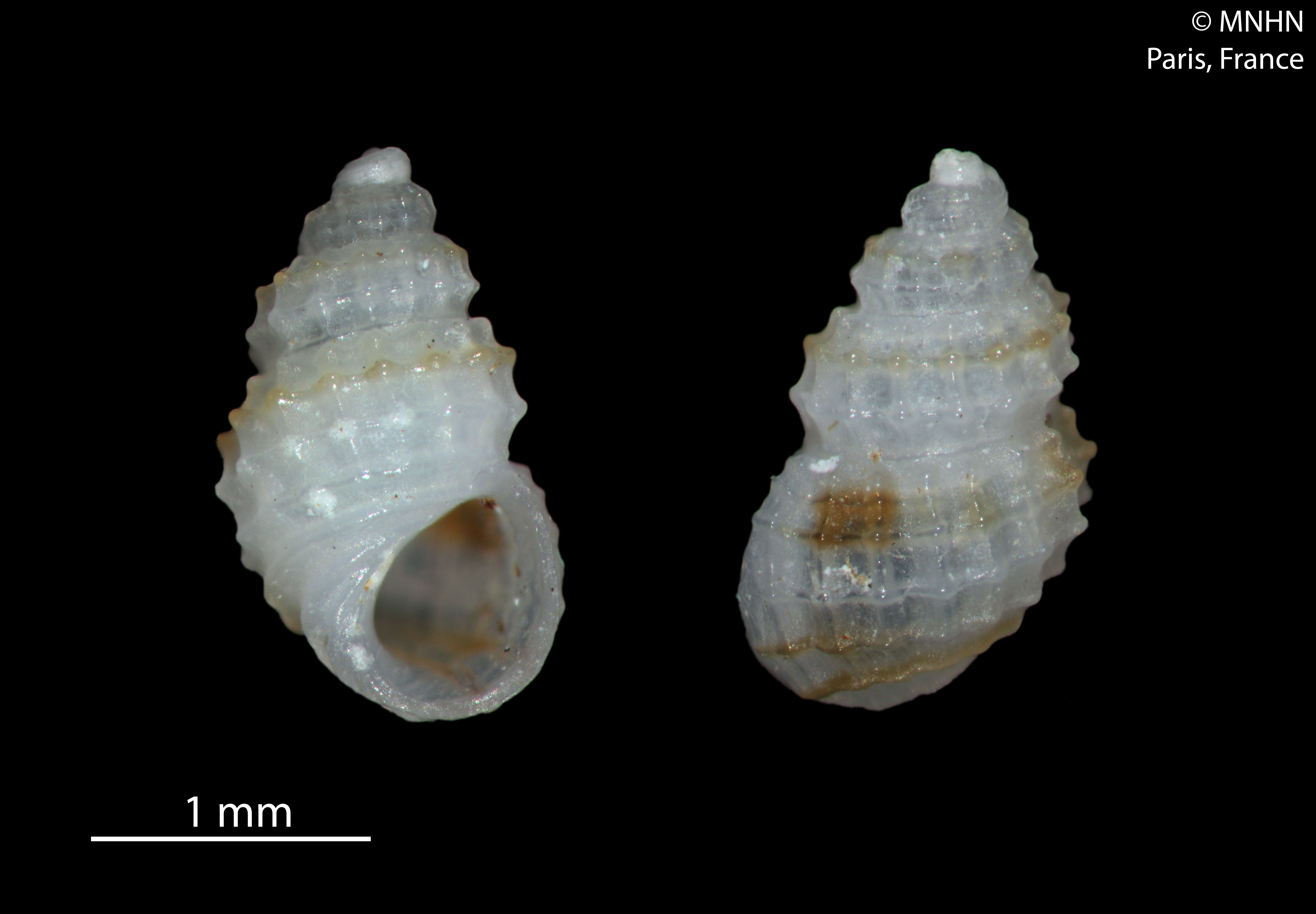
- Shell of Alvania bermudensis (paratype at MNHN, Paris)

Scientific classification
- Kingdom: Animalia
- Phylum: Mollusca
- Class: Gastropoda
- Subclass: Caenogastropoda
- Order: Littorinimorpha
- Superfamily: Rissooidea
- Family: Rissoidae
- Genus: Alvania
- Species: A. bermudensis

Binomial name
- Alvania bermudensis Faber & Moolenbeek, 1987

Synonyms
- Alvania (Simulamerelina) bermudensis Faber & Moolenbeek, 1987

= Alvania bermudensis =

Species of gastropod

Alvania bermudensis is a species of small sea snail, a marine gastropod mollusk or micromollusk in the family Rissoidae.

== Distribution ==
This marine species occurs in the Atlantic Ocean off Bermuda.
