= Alvania hauniensis =

Scientific classification
- Kingdom: Animalia
- Phylum: Mollusca
- Class: Gastropoda
- Subclass: Caenogastropoda
- Order: Littorinimorpha
- Superfamily: Rissooidea
- Family: Rissoidae
- Genus: Alvania
- Species: †A. hauniensis

Binomial name
- †Alvania hauniensis Ravn, 1939 †

Synonyms
- † Alvania (Arsenia) hauniensis Ravn, 1939 †

Species of gastropod

Alvania hauniensis is an extinct species of minute sea snail, a marine gastropod mollusc or micromollusk in the family Rissoidae.

== Distribution ==
Fossils of this species were in Paleocene strata near Copenhagen, Denmark (age range: 61.7 to 58.7 Ma)
