= Alvania playagrandensis =

Scientific classification
- Kingdom: Animalia
- Phylum: Mollusca
- Class: Gastropoda
- Subclass: Caenogastropoda
- Order: Littorinimorpha
- Superfamily: Rissooidea
- Family: Rissoidae
- Genus: Alvania
- Species: †A. playagrandensis

Binomial name
- †Alvania playagrandensis Weisbord, 1962

Species of gastropod

Alvania playagrandensis is an extinct species of minute sea snail, a marine gastropod mollusc or micromollusk in the family Rissoidae.

== Description ==
The length of the shell attains 1.4 millimetres (0.055 in), its diameter 0.7 millimetres (0.028 in).

== Distribution ==
Fossils of this species were found in Late Cenozoic strata in northern Venezuela.
