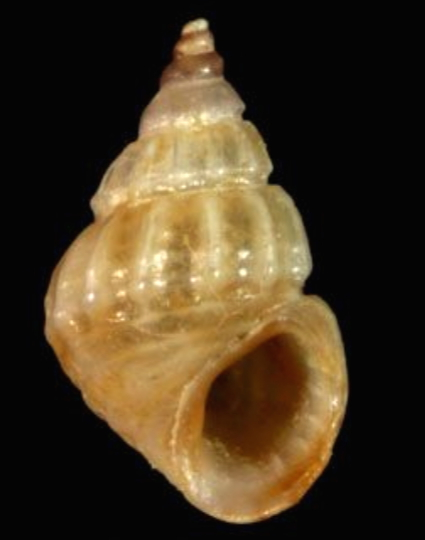
- Shell of Alvania corona (specimen at the Natural History Museum, Rotterdam)

Scientific classification
- Kingdom: Animalia
- Phylum: Mollusca
- Class: Gastropoda
- Subclass: Caenogastropoda
- Order: Littorinimorpha
- Superfamily: Rissooidea
- Family: Rissoidae
- Genus: Alvania
- Species: A. corona

Binomial name
- Alvania corona Nordsieck, 1972

= Alvania corona =

Species of gastropod

Alvania corona is a species of minute sea snail, a marine gastropod mollusk or micromollusk in the family Rissoidae.

== Description ==
The length of the shell attains 3.4 mm.

== Distribution ==
This species occurs in the Mediterranean Sea off Sicily.
