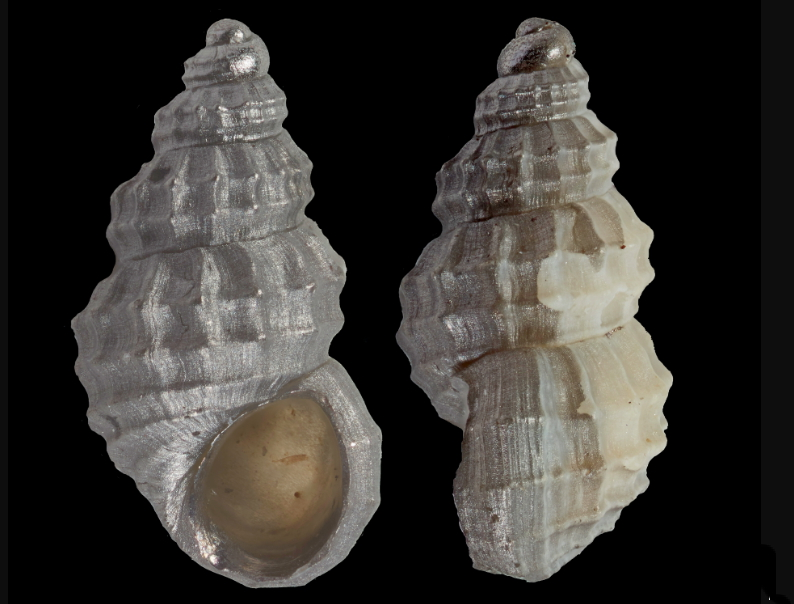
- Shell of Alvania richeri (holotype at MNHN, Paris)

Scientific classification
- Kingdom: Animalia
- Phylum: Mollusca
- Class: Gastropoda
- Subclass: Caenogastropoda
- Order: Littorinimorpha
- Family: Rissoidae
- Genus: Alvania
- Species: A. richeri

Binomial name
- Alvania richeri Gofas, 1999

= Alvania richeri =

Species of gastropod

Alvania richeri is a species of minute sea snail, a marine gastropod mollusk or micromollusk in the family Rissoidae.

== Description ==
The length of the shell attains 2.7 mm.

== Distribution ==
This marine species occurs off Senegal.
