= Alvania gallegosi =

Scientific classification
- Kingdom: Animalia
- Phylum: Mollusca
- Class: Gastropoda
- Subclass: Caenogastropoda
- Order: Littorinimorpha
- Family: Rissoidae
- Genus: Alvania
- Species: A. gallegosi

Binomial name
- Alvania gallegosi F. Baker, G. D. Hanna & A. M. Strong, 1930

Species of gastropod

Alvania gallegosi is a species of small sea snail, a marine gastropod mollusc or micromollusc in the family Rissoidae.

== Description ==
The length of the shell attains 2.6 mm, its diameter is 1.1 mm.

== Distribution ==
This marine species occurs in the Gulf of California.
