= Alvania curacaoensis =

Scientific classification
- Kingdom: Animalia
- Phylum: Mollusca
- Class: Gastropoda
- Subclass: Caenogastropoda
- Order: Littorinimorpha
- Superfamily: Rissooidea
- Family: Rissoidae
- Genus: Alvania
- Species: A. curacaoensis

Binomial name
- Alvania curacaoensis De Jong & Coomans, 1988

Species of gastropod

Alvania curacaoensis is a species of minute sea snail, a marine gastropod mollusk or micromollusk in the family Rissoidae.

== Description ==
The length of the shell attains 1 mm.

== Distribution ==
This species occurs off Curaçao and Bonaire, Netherlands Antilles.
