= Alvania jacquesi =

Scientific classification
- Kingdom: Animalia
- Phylum: Mollusca
- Class: Gastropoda
- Subclass: Caenogastropoda
- Order: Littorinimorpha
- Family: Rissoidae
- Genus: Alvania
- Species: A. jacquesi

Binomial name
- Alvania jacquesi Hoenselaar & Goud, 1998

Species of gastropod

Alvania jacquesi is a species of minute sea snail, a marine gastropod mollusk or micromollusk in the family Rissoidae.

== Description ==
The length of the shell varies between 1.4 mm and 4 mm.

== Distribution ==
This species occurs in the Atlantic Ocean off Cape Verde.
