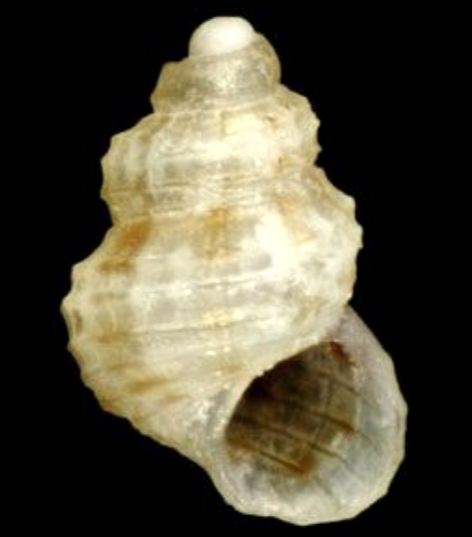
- Shell of Alvania faberi (specimen at the Natural History Museum, Rotterdam)

Scientific classification
- Kingdom: Animalia
- Phylum: Mollusca
- Class: Gastropoda
- Subclass: Caenogastropoda
- Order: Littorinimorpha
- Superfamily: Rissooidea
- Family: Rissoidae
- Genus: Alvania
- Species: A. faberi

Binomial name
- Alvania faberi De Jong & Coomans, 1988

= Alvania faberi =

Species of gastropod

Alvania faberi is a species of small sea snail, a marine gastropod mollusk or micromollusk in the family Rissoidae.

== Description ==
The length of the shell attains 1.4 mm.

== Distribution ==
This species occurs off Bonaire, Netherlands Antilles.
