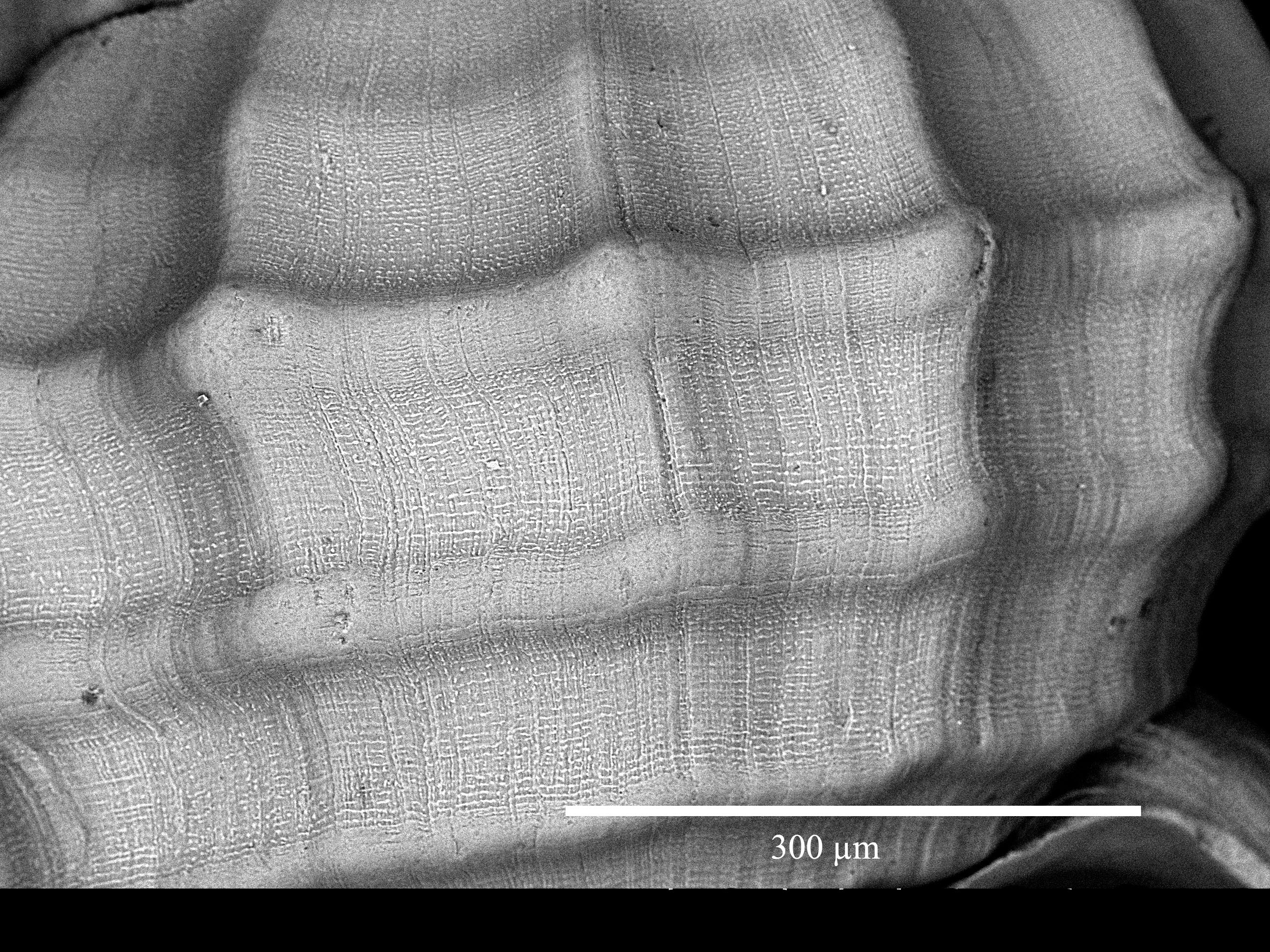
- Close-up of the shell of Alvania skylla (holotype at MNHN, Paris)

Scientific classification
- Kingdom: Animalia
- Phylum: Mollusca
- Class: Gastropoda
- Subclass: Caenogastropoda
- Order: Littorinimorpha
- Family: Rissoidae
- Genus: Alvania
- Species: A. skylla

Binomial name
- Alvania skylla Tisselli & Micali, 2023

= Alvania skylla =

Species of gastropod

Alvania skylla is a species of minute sea snail, a marine gastropod mollusk or micromollusk in the family Rissoidae.

== Description ==
The length of the shell attains 1.86 mm.

== Distribution ==
This species occurs in the Central Mediterranean Sea in Italy off Reggio di Calabria.
