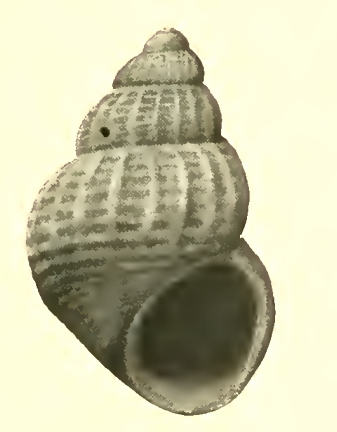
- Shell of Alvania rosana (holotype)

Scientific classification
- Kingdom: Animalia
- Phylum: Mollusca
- Class: Gastropoda
- Subclass: Caenogastropoda
- Order: Littorinimorpha
- Superfamily: Rissooidea
- Family: Rissoidae
- Genus: Alvania
- Species: A. rosana

Binomial name
- Alvania rosana Bartsch, 1911

Synonyms
- Alvania burradensis Bartsch, 1927 (Subsequent incorrect spelling or printer's error); Alvania burrardensis Bartsch, 1921

= Alvania rosana =

Species of gastropod

Alvania rosana is a species of small sea snail, a marine gastropod mollusk or micromollusk in the family Rissoidae.

== Description ==
The length of the shell attains 2.6 mm, its diameter 1.5 mm.

(Original description) The broadly ovate shell is yellowish white. The protoconch contains 2½ smooth, well rounded whorls. The whorls of the teleoconch are well rounded. They are marked by narrow, well-rounded, somewhat sinuous, almost vertical, axial ribs which are about one-third as wide as the spaces that separate them. Of these ribs 24 occur upon the second and the penultimate whorl. In addition to the axial sculpture the whorls are marked by low, rounded, equal and equally spaced spiral cords, which are a little weaker than the axial ribs. Of these cords 6 occur between the sutures on the second whorl and 7 on the penultimate whorl, the first being at the summit. These spiral cords are a little narrower than the spaces that separate them. The suture is moderately constricted. The periphery of the body whorl is inflated and is marked by a sulcus which is as wide as the spaces that separate the cords on the spire and, like them, crossed by the continuations of the axial ribs, which terminate at the posterior border of the first basal keel. The base of the shell is strongly rounded, narrowly umbilicated and very slightly attenuated anteriorly. It is marked by eight equal and equally spaced spiral cords which are about as wide as the spaces that separate them. The aperture is broadly oval. The posterior angle is obtuse. The outer lip thick, re-enforced immediately behind the edge by a moderately thick callus. The inner lip is strongly curved and somewhat reflected over and partly appressed to the base. The parietal wall is covered with a moderately thick callus.

== Distribution ==
This species occurs in the Pacific Ocean off California.
