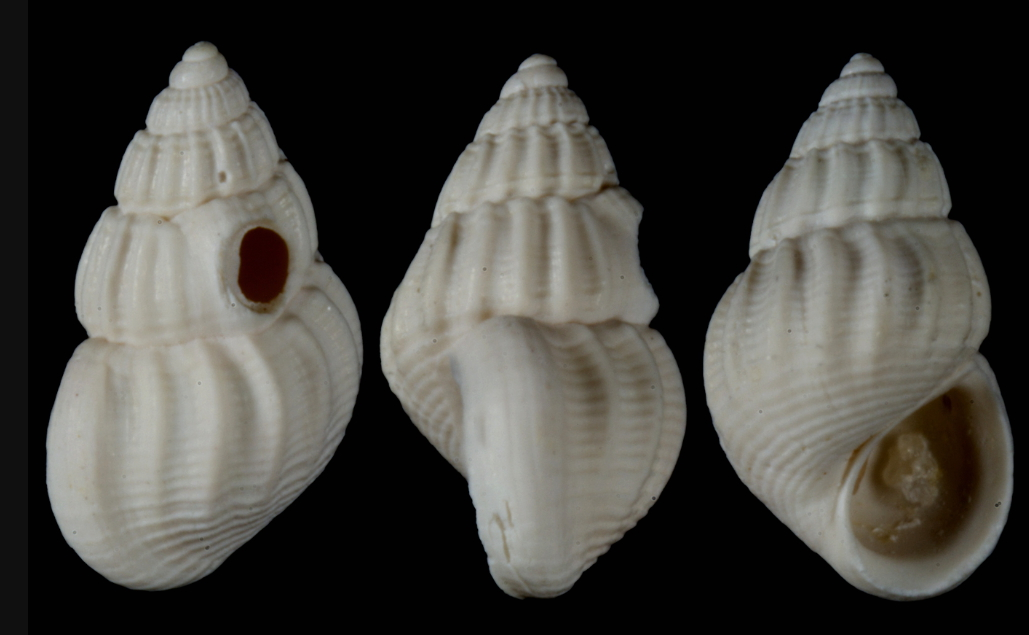
- Shell of Alvania areolifera (holotype at MNHN, Paris)

Scientific classification
- Kingdom: Animalia
- Phylum: Mollusca
- Class: Gastropoda
- Subclass: Caenogastropoda
- Order: Littorinimorpha
- Superfamily: Rissooidea
- Family: Rissoidae
- Genus: Alvania
- Species: †A. areolifera

Binomial name
- †Alvania areolifera (F. Sandberger, 1863)

Synonyms
- † Rissoa areolifera F. Sandberger, 1860 (basionym)

= Alvania areolifera =

Species of gastropod

Alvania areolifera is an extinct species of minute sea snail, a marine gastropod mollusc or micromollusk in the family Rissoidae.

== Distribution ==
Fossils of this species were found in Oligocene strata in Île-de-France, France and in Rupelian strata in Rhineland-Palatinate, Germany.
