= Alvania cranchiana =

Scientific classification
- Kingdom: Animalia
- Phylum: Mollusca
- Class: Gastropoda
- Subclass: Caenogastropoda
- Order: Littorinimorpha
- Superfamily: Rissooidea
- Family: Rissoidae
- Genus: Alvania
- Species: A. cranchiana

Binomial name
- Alvania cranchiana Leach, 1852

Species of sea snail

Alvania cranchiana is a species of minute sea snail, a marine gastropod mollusk or micromollusk in the family Rissoidae.

== Description ==
The length of the shell attains 3.17 mm.

(Original description) The white shell is smooth. The suture is moderately deep. The five whorls are very smooth.

== Distribution ==
This species occurs at the Devonshire and Cornish coasts, Great Britain.
