= Alvania riparia =

Scientific classification
- Kingdom: Animalia
- Phylum: Mollusca
- Class: Gastropoda
- Subclass: Caenogastropoda
- Order: Littorinimorpha
- Superfamily: Rissooidea
- Family: Rissoidae
- Genus: Alvania
- Species: †A. riparia

Binomial name
- †Alvania riparia Lozouet, 1998

Species of gastropod

Alvania riparia is an extinct species of minute sea snail, a marine gastropod mollusc or micromollusk in the family Rissoidae.

== Description ==
The length of the shell attains 2.37 mm, its diameter is 1.61 mm.

== Distribution ==
Fossils of this species were found in Oligocene strata in Aquitaine, France; age range: 28.4 to 23.03 Ma.
