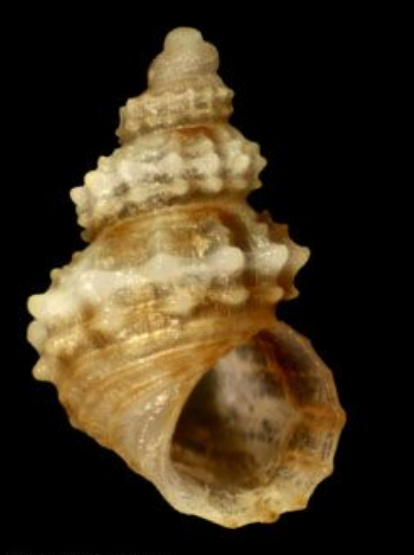
- Shell of Alvania lucinae (specimen at the Natural History Museum, Rotterdam)

Scientific classification
- Kingdom: Animalia
- Phylum: Mollusca
- Class: Gastropoda
- Subclass: Caenogastropoda
- Order: Littorinimorpha
- Superfamily: Rissooidea
- Family: Rissoidae
- Genus: Alvania
- Species: A. lucinae

Binomial name
- Alvania lucinae Oberling, 1970

Synonyms
- Alvania gothica van Aartsen & van der Linden, 1986

= Alvania lucinae =

Species of gastropod

Alvania lucinae is a species of small sea snail, a marine gastropod mollusk or micromollusk in the family Rissoidae. It was discovered and named in 1970 by Oberling.

== Description ==
The length of the shell varies between 1.4 mm and 2 mm.

== Distribution ==
This species occurs in the Mediterranean Sea (Corsica, Greece, Turkey).
