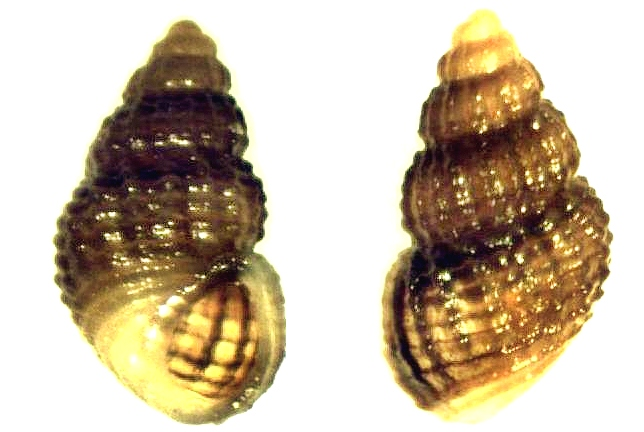
- Several views of a shell of Alvania mediolittoralis

Scientific classification
- Kingdom: Animalia
- Phylum: Mollusca
- Class: Gastropoda
- Subclass: Caenogastropoda
- Order: Littorinimorpha
- Family: Rissoidae
- Genus: Alvania
- Species: A. mediolittoralis

Binomial name
- Alvania mediolittoralis Gofas, 1989

Synonyms
- Alvania (Alvania) mariae Orbigny, A.V.M.D. d'

= Alvania mediolittoralis =

Species of gastropod

Alvania mediolittoralis is a species of small sea snail, a marine gastropod mollusk or micromollusk in the family Rissoidae.

== Description ==
The length of the shell varies between 2.2 mm and 3 mm.

== Distribution ==
This species occurs in the Atlantic Ocean off the Azores and Madeira.
