= Alvania gemina =

Scientific classification
- Kingdom: Animalia
- Phylum: Mollusca
- Class: Gastropoda
- Subclass: Caenogastropoda
- Order: Littorinimorpha
- Family: Rissoidae
- Genus: Alvania
- Species: A. gemina

Binomial name
- Alvania gemina Rolán & Hernández, 2007

Species of gastropod

Alvania gemina is a species of minute sea snail, a marine gastropod mollusc or micromollusc in the family Rissoidae.

== Description ==
The length of the shell attains 3 mm.

== Distribution ==
This marine species occurs off São Tomé Island (Gulf of Guinea, West Africa).
