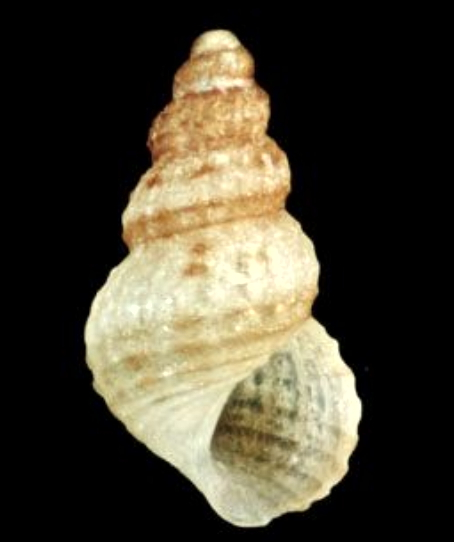
- Shell of Alvania sororcula (specimen at the Natural History Museum, Rotterdam)

Scientific classification
- Kingdom: Animalia
- Phylum: Mollusca
- Class: Gastropoda
- Subclass: Caenogastropoda
- Order: Littorinimorpha
- Superfamily: Rissooidea
- Family: Rissoidae
- Genus: Alvania
- Species: A. sororcula

Binomial name
- Alvania sororcula Granata-Grillo, 1877

Synonyms
- Rissoa (Alvania) asperella Granata Grillo, 1877; Rissoa (Alvania) sororcula Granata Grillo, 1877; Rissoa (Alvania) sororcula var. major Granata Grillo, 1877 ·

= Alvania sororcula =

Species of gastropod

Alvania sororcula is a species of minute sea snail, a marine gastropod mollusk or micromollusk in the family Rissoidae.

== Description ==
The length of the shell varies between 3 mm and 4 mm.

The shell is whitish or fulvous.it shows prominent spiral lirae, decussated by a less elevated longitudinal sculpture, which becomes obsolete on the base. The shell contains five, convex, subangulate whorls. The suture is deepand channeled. The outer lip is scarcely varicose.

== Distribution ==
This species occurs in the Mediterranean Sea off Italy (Island of Elba) and off Greece.
