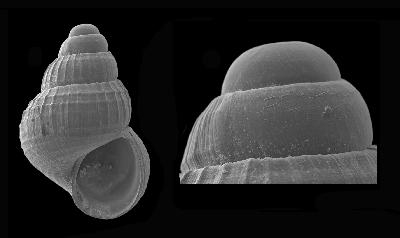
- Shell of Alvania funiculata (holotype at MNHN, Paris)

Scientific classification
- Kingdom: Animalia
- Phylum: Mollusca
- Class: Gastropoda
- Subclass: Caenogastropoda
- Order: Littorinimorpha
- Family: Rissoidae
- Genus: Alvania
- Species: A. funiculata

Binomial name
- Alvania funiculata Gofas, 2007

= Alvania funiculata =

Species of gastropod

Alvania funiculata is a species of minute sea snail, a marine gastropod mollusc or micromollusc in the family Rissoidae.

== Description ==
The length of the shell varies between 1.8 mm and 2 mm.

== Distribution ==
This marine species occurs on the northeast Atlantic Hyères Seamount.
