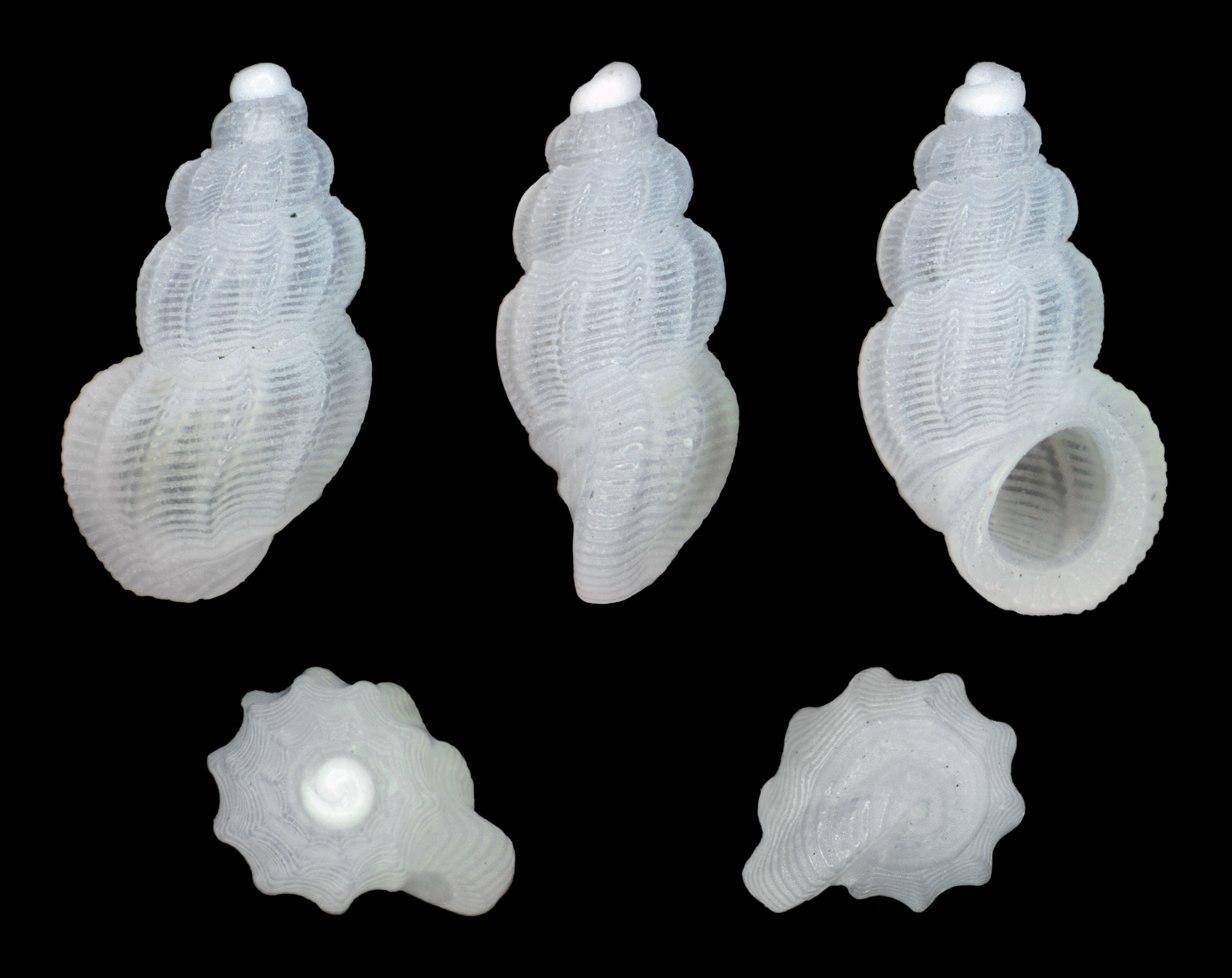
- Manzonia wilmae Moolenbeek & Faber, 1987

Scientific classification
- Kingdom: Animalia
- Phylum: Mollusca
- Class: Gastropoda
- Subclass: Caenogastropoda
- Order: Littorinimorpha
- Family: Rissoidae
- Genus: Manzonia; Brusina, 1870

= Manzonia =

Genus of gastropods

Manzonia is a genus of minute sea snails, marine gastropod molluscs or micromolluscs in the family Rissoidae.

== Species ==
Species within the genus Manzonia include:

- Manzonia alexandrei Gofas, 2010
- Manzonia arata Gofas, 2007
- Manzonia bacalladoi Segers & Swinnen, 2002
- Manzonia boavistensis Rolán, 1987
- Manzonia boogi Moolenbeek & Faber, 1987
- Manzonia boucheti Amati, 1992
- Manzonia bravensis Rolán, 1987
- Manzonia carboverdensis Rolán, 1987
- Manzonia castanea Moolenbeek & Faber, 1987
- Manzonia crassa (Kanmacher, 1798)
- Manzonia crispa (Watson, 1873)
- Manzonia darwini Moolenbeek & Faber, 1987
- Manzonia dionisi Rolán, 1987
- Manzonia fusulus Gofas, 2007
- Manzonia geometrica Beck & Gofas, 2007
- Manzonia guitiani Rolán, 1987
- Manzonia heroensis Moolenbeek & Hoenselaar, 1992
- Manzonia insulsa Rolán, 1987
- Manzonia lusitanica Gofas, 2007
- Manzonia madeirensis Moolenbeek & Faber, 1987
- Manzonia manzoniana (Rolán, 1983)
- Manzonia overdiepi van Aartsen, 1983
- Manzonia salensis Rolán, 1987
- Manzonia segadei Rolán, 1987
- Manzonia taeniata Gofas, 2007
- Manzonia unifasciata Dautzenberg, 1889
- Manzonia vigoensis (Rolán, 1983)
- Manzonia wilmae Moolenbeek & Faber, 1987
- Manzonia xicoi Rolán, 1987

Species brought into synonymy

- Manzonia aequisculpta (Keep, 1887): synonym of Alvinia aequisculpta (Keep, 1887): synonym of Alvania aequisculpta Keep, 1887
- Manzonia almo (Bartsch, 1911): synonym of Alvania almo Bartsch, 1911
- Manzonia corruga (Laseron, 1956): synonym of Simulamerelina corruga (Laseron, 1956)
- Manzonia cosmia (Bartsch, 1911): synonym of Alvinia cosmia (Bartsch, 1911): synonym of Alvania cosmia Bartsch, 1911
- Manzonia crassula (Rehder, 1980): synonym of Simulamerelina crassula (Rehder, 1980)
- Manzonia gemmata (Powell, 1927): synonym of Simulamerelina gemmata (Powell, 1927)
- Manzonia gibbera (Watson, 1873): synonym of Madeiranzonia gibbera (Watson, 1873)
- Manzonia granulosa (Pease, 1862): synonym of Simulamerelina granulosa (Pease, 1862)
- Manzonia hewa (Kay, 1979): synonym of Simulamerelina hewa (Kay, 1979)
- Manzonia longinqua (Rehder, 1980): synonym of Simulamerelina longinqua (Rehder, 1980)
- Manzonia minuta Hornung & Mermod, 1927: synonym of Sansoniella minuta (Hornung & Mermod, 1927)
- Manzonia purpurea (Dall, 1871): synonym of Alvinia purpurea (Dall, 1871): synonym of Alvania purpurea Dall, 1871
- Manzonia tokyoensis (Pilsbry, 1904): synonym of Simulamerelina tokyoensis (Pilsbry, 1904)
- Manzonia wanawana (Kay, 1979): synonym of Simulamerelina wanawana (Kay, 1979)
- Manzonia zetlandica (Montagu, 1815): synonym of Alvinia zetlandica Montagu, 1815: synonym of Alvania zetlandica (Montagu, 1815)
