= Manzonia fusulus =

Scientific classification
- Kingdom: Animalia
- Phylum: Mollusca
- Class: Gastropoda
- Subclass: Caenogastropoda
- Order: Littorinimorpha
- Family: Rissoidae
- Genus: Manzonia
- Species: M. fusulus

Binomial name
- Manzonia fusulus Gofas, 2007

Species of gastropod

Manzonia fusulus is a species of small sea snail, a marine gastropod mollusc or micromollusc in the family Rissoidae.
