= Manzonia heroensis =

Scientific classification
- Kingdom: Animalia
- Phylum: Mollusca
- Class: Gastropoda
- Subclass: Caenogastropoda
- Order: Littorinimorpha
- Family: Rissoidae
- Genus: Manzonia
- Species: M. heroensis

Binomial name
- Manzonia heroensis Moolenbeek & Hoenselaar, 1992

Species of gastropod

Manzonia heroensis is a species of minute sea snail, a marine gastropod mollusc or micromollusc in the family Rissoidae.

== Description ==
The shell has a distinct spiral shape and usually has a brown or gray hue.
