= Omanimerelina eloiseae =

Scientific classification
- Kingdom: Animalia
- Phylum: Mollusca
- Class: Gastropoda
- Subclass: Caenogastropoda
- Order: Littorinimorpha
- Family: Rissoidae
- Genus: Omanimerelina
- Species: O. eloiseae

Binomial name
- Omanimerelina eloiseae Moolenbeek & Bosch, 2007

Species of gastropod

Omanimerelina eloiseae is a species of small sea snail, a marine gastropod mollusk or micromollusk in the family Rissoidae.
