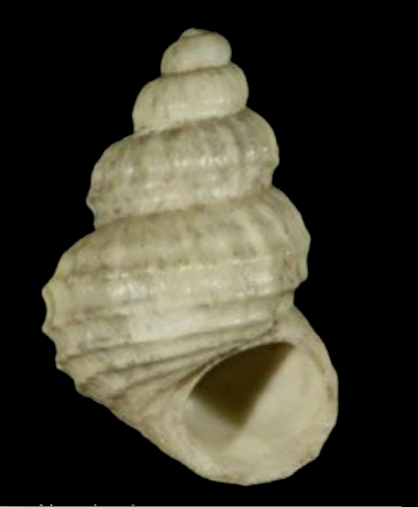
- Shell of Alvania almo (specimen at the Natural History Museum, Rotterdam)

Scientific classification
- Kingdom: Animalia
- Phylum: Mollusca
- Class: Gastropoda
- Subclass: Caenogastropoda
- Order: Littorinimorpha
- Superfamily: Rissooidea
- Family: Rissoidae
- Genus: Alvania
- Species: A. almo

Binomial name
- Alvania almo Bartsch, 1911

Synonyms
- Alvinia almo (Bartsch, 1911); Manzonia almo (Bartsch, 1911)

= Alvania almo =

Species of gastropod

Alvania almo is a species of small sea snail, a marine gastropod mollusk or micromollusk in the family Rissoidae.

== Description ==
The length of the shell attains 3 mm to 4.7 mm.

The shell is imperforate. It has rounded longitudinal ribs and about equal interspaces. it is yellowish brown, with a brown subsutural band and three more on the base. The lip is simple and sharp.

The minute, broadly oval shell is yellowish white. The 1½ whorls of the protoconch are well rounded and smooth. The whorls of the teleoconch are somewhat inflated and slopingly shouldered at the summit. They are marked by very slender, almost vertical axial ribs, of which 18 occur upon the first, and 20 upon the penultimate turn. In addition to the axial sculpture, the whorls are marked between the sutures by two spiral cords equaling the ribs in strength. Of these, the first is a little posterior to the middle of the whorls, bounding the sloping shoulder, while the second is halfway between it and the suture. The intersections of the axial ribs and spiral cords form slender tubercles, while the spaces enclosed between them are well impressed, squarish pits. The spaces enclosed between the first spiral cord and the summit and the axial ribs are rhomboidal areas, having their long axes parallel to the axial sculpture, while the spaces enclosed between the second spiral cord and the axial ribs and the suture are squarish pits. The suture is moderatelyconstricted. The periphery of the body whorl is marked by a spiral sulcus, which is crossed by the continuations of the axial ribs. The base of the shell is narrowly umbilicated — the umbilical chink being bounded by a tumid area — moderately long, well rounded, slightly produced anteriorly, and marked on the posterior half by two spiral cords equaling those between the sutures. The aperture is almost circular. The outer lip is very thick all around, re-enforced by a strong varix. The inner lip is very stout, partly reflected over, and appressed to the base. The parietal wall is covered with a very thick callus which renders the peritreme complete.

== Taxonomy ==
This and other Western American species were attributed to Alvinia Monterosato, 1884, following Keen (1971); nevertheless it is not proved to be more related to the Mediterranean type species Alvania weinkauffi Weinkauff, 1868 tan to other Alvania s.l. and is therefore retained in Alvania

== Distribution ==
This species occurs in the Atlantic Ocean off North Carolina, USA.
