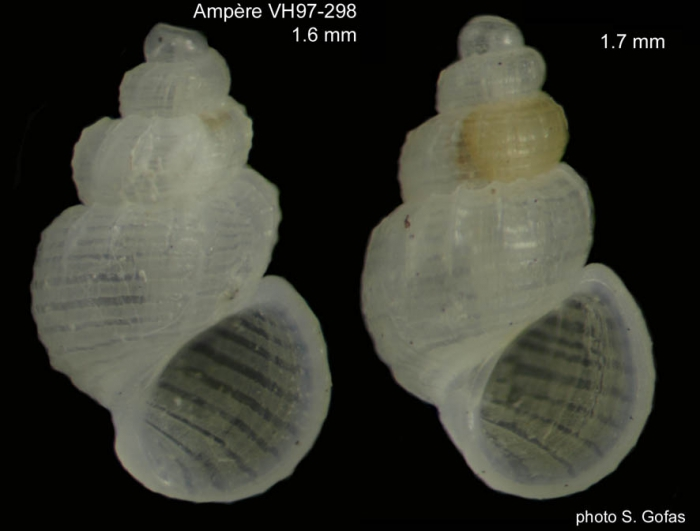
- Shell and live-collected specimen from Ampère Seamount (110 meters)

Scientific classification
- Kingdom: Animalia
- Phylum: Mollusca
- Class: Gastropoda
- Subclass: Caenogastropoda
- Order: Littorinimorpha
- Family: Rissoidae
- Genus: Manzonia
- Species: M. arata

Binomial name
- Manzonia arata Gofas, 2007

= Manzonia arata =

Species of gastropod

Manzonia arata is a species of small sea snail, a marine gastropod mollusc or micromollusc in the family Rissoidae.
