= Plagyostila senegalensis =

Scientific classification
- Kingdom: Animalia
- Phylum: Mollusca
- Class: Gastropoda
- Subclass: Caenogastropoda
- Order: Littorinimorpha
- Family: Rissoidae
- Genus: Plagyostila
- Species: P. senegalensis

Binomial name
- Plagyostila senegalensis Rolán & Pelorce, 2002

Species of gastropod

Plagyostila senegalensis is a species of small sea snail, a marine gastropod mollusk or micromollusk in the family Rissoidae.
