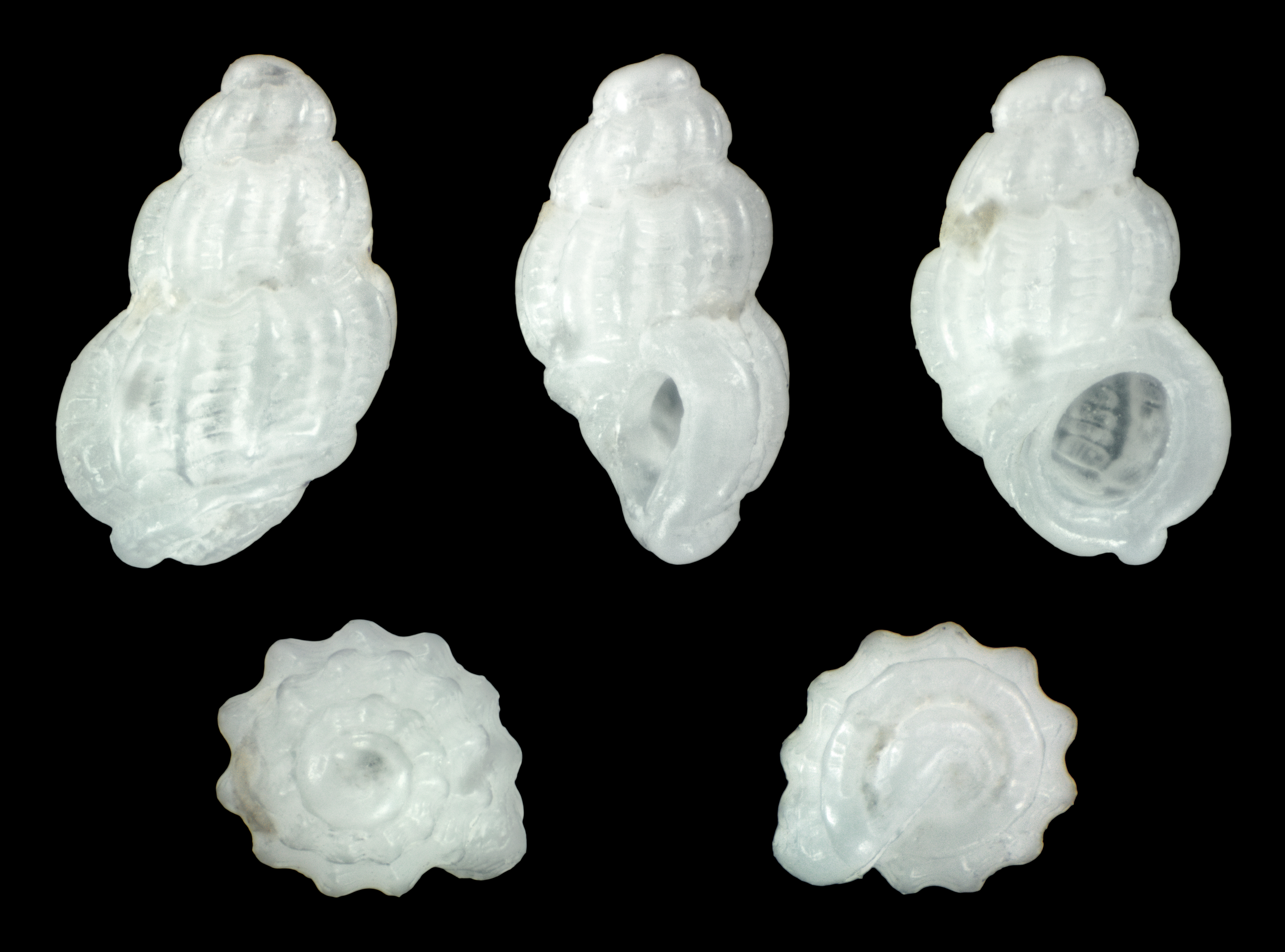

Scientific classification
- Kingdom: Animalia
- Phylum: Mollusca
- Class: Gastropoda
- Subclass: Caenogastropoda
- Order: Littorinimorpha
- Family: Rissoidae
- Genus: Manzonia
- Species: M. dionisi

Binomial name
- Manzonia dionisi Rolán, 1987

Synonyms
- Manzonia pelorum Moolenbeek & Faber, 1987

= Manzonia dionisi =

Species of gastropod

Manzonia dionisi is a species of small sea snail, a marine gastropod mollusc or micromollusc in the family Rissoidae.
