= Gofasia obtusellaeformis =

Scientific classification
- Kingdom: Animalia
- Phylum: Mollusca
- Class: Gastropoda
- Subclass: Caenogastropoda
- Order: Littorinimorpha
- Family: Rissoidae
- Genus: Gofasia
- Species: G. obtusellaeformis

Binomial name
- Gofasia obtusellaeformis Gofas, 2007

Species of gastropod

Gofasia obtusellaeformis is a species of minute sea snail, a marine gastropod mollusc or micromollusc in the family Rissoidae.
