= Manzonia boavistensis =

Scientific classification
- Kingdom: Animalia
- Phylum: Mollusca
- Class: Gastropoda
- Subclass: Caenogastropoda
- Order: Littorinimorpha
- Family: Rissoidae
- Genus: Manzonia
- Species: M. boavistensis

Binomial name
- Manzonia boavistensis Rolán, 1987

Species of gastropod

Manzonia boavistensis is a species of small sea snail, a marine gastropod mollusc or micromollusc in the family Rissoidae. It has been found off the islands of Boa Vista and Sal, Cape Verde.
