= Porosalvania angulifera =

Scientific classification
- Kingdom: Animalia
- Phylum: Mollusca
- Class: Gastropoda
- Subclass: Caenogastropoda
- Order: Littorinimorpha
- Family: Rissoidae
- Genus: Porosalvania
- Species: P. angulifera

Binomial name
- Porosalvania angulifera Gofas, 2007

Species of gastropod

Porosalvania angulifera is a species of small sea snail, a marine gastropod mollusk or micromollusk in the family Rissoidae.

== Description ==
The shell ranges from 1.5 to 2.0 mm in length. The protoconch is around 1.25 whorls and the teleoconch is around 3.25 to 3.75. The protoconch has "spirally oriented" wrinkles, while the teleoconch has a spire with angulated whorls and strong axial folds. The outer lip is thick externally.

The shell has a white color.

== Biology ==
This species undergoes direct larval development, with a paucispiral protoconch.

== Distribution ==
This species has been found in the Hyères Seamount and Great Meteor Seamount.
