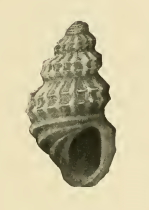
- Shell of Alvania cosmia (holotype)

Scientific classification
- Kingdom: Animalia
- Phylum: Mollusca
- Class: Gastropoda
- Subclass: Caenogastropoda
- Order: Littorinimorpha
- Superfamily: Rissooidea
- Family: Rissoidae
- Genus: Alvania
- Species: A. cosmia

Binomial name
- Alvania cosmia Bartsch, 1911

Synonyms
- Alvinia cosmia (Bartsch, 1911); Manzonia cosmia (Bartsch, 1911); Rissoina cosmia (Bartsch, 1911); ·

= Alvania cosmia =

Species of gastropod

Alvania cosmia is a species of small sea snail, a marine gastropod mollusk or micromollusk in the family Rissoidae.

== Taxonomy ==
This and other Western American species were attributed to Alvinia Monterosato, 1884, following Keen (1971); nevertheless it is not proved to be more related to the Mediterranean type species Alvania weinkauffi Weinkauff, 1868 than to other Alvania s.l. and is therefore retained in Alvania.

== Description ==
The length of the shell attains 2.2 mm, it diameter 1.2 mm.

(Original description) The small shell is elongate-ovate. It is white and semitranslucent. The protoconch consists of 1½ whorls and is marked by four, moderately strong, spiral lirations which are separated by strongly impressed lines. The teleoconch whorls are appressed at the summit, strongly, slopingly shouldered. The shoulder extends from the summit to the anterior termination of the posterior third between the sutures. It is marked by two strong nodulose, spiral keels, of which the first is situated on the angle of the shoulder, while the second is about as far posterior to the suture as the first is anterior to the summit. In addition to these spiral keels, the whorls are marked by moderately strong, axial ribs which become enfeebled on the shoulder and anterior to the second keel. Of these ribs, 16 occur upon the first and second, and 18 upon the penultimate turn. The spaces enclosed between the spiral keels and axial ribs are large, deeply impressed, squarish pits, while their junctions form cusp-like tubercles. The suture is strongly channeled. The periphery of the body whorl is marked by a strong, sublamellar, spiral keel. The base of the shell is moderately long, marked by three spiral keels, which grow successively weaker and closer spaced from the periphery to the umbilical area. The broad spaces between the spiral keels are marked by slender, axial lines of growth. The aperture is broadly ovate. The posterior angle is obtuse. The outer lip is reinforced immediately behind the edge by a strong varix, transparent, showing the external sculpture within. The inner lip is rather stout, decidedly curved, and strongly reflected over and appressed to the base. The parietal wall is covered with a thick callus which renders the peritreme complete.

== Distribution ==
This species occurs in the Pacific Ocean off Lower California.
