= Manzonia madeirensis =

Scientific classification
- Kingdom: Animalia
- Phylum: Mollusca
- Class: Gastropoda
- Subclass: Caenogastropoda
- Order: Littorinimorpha
- Family: Rissoidae
- Genus: Manzonia
- Species: M. madeirensis

Binomial name
- Manzonia madeirensis Moolenbeek & Faber, 1987

Species of gastropod

Manzonia madeirensis is a species of small sea snail, a marine gastropod mollusc or micromollusc in the family Rissoidae.

== Distribution ==
The species has been found in the Atlantic Ocean, in the Madeira archipelago.
