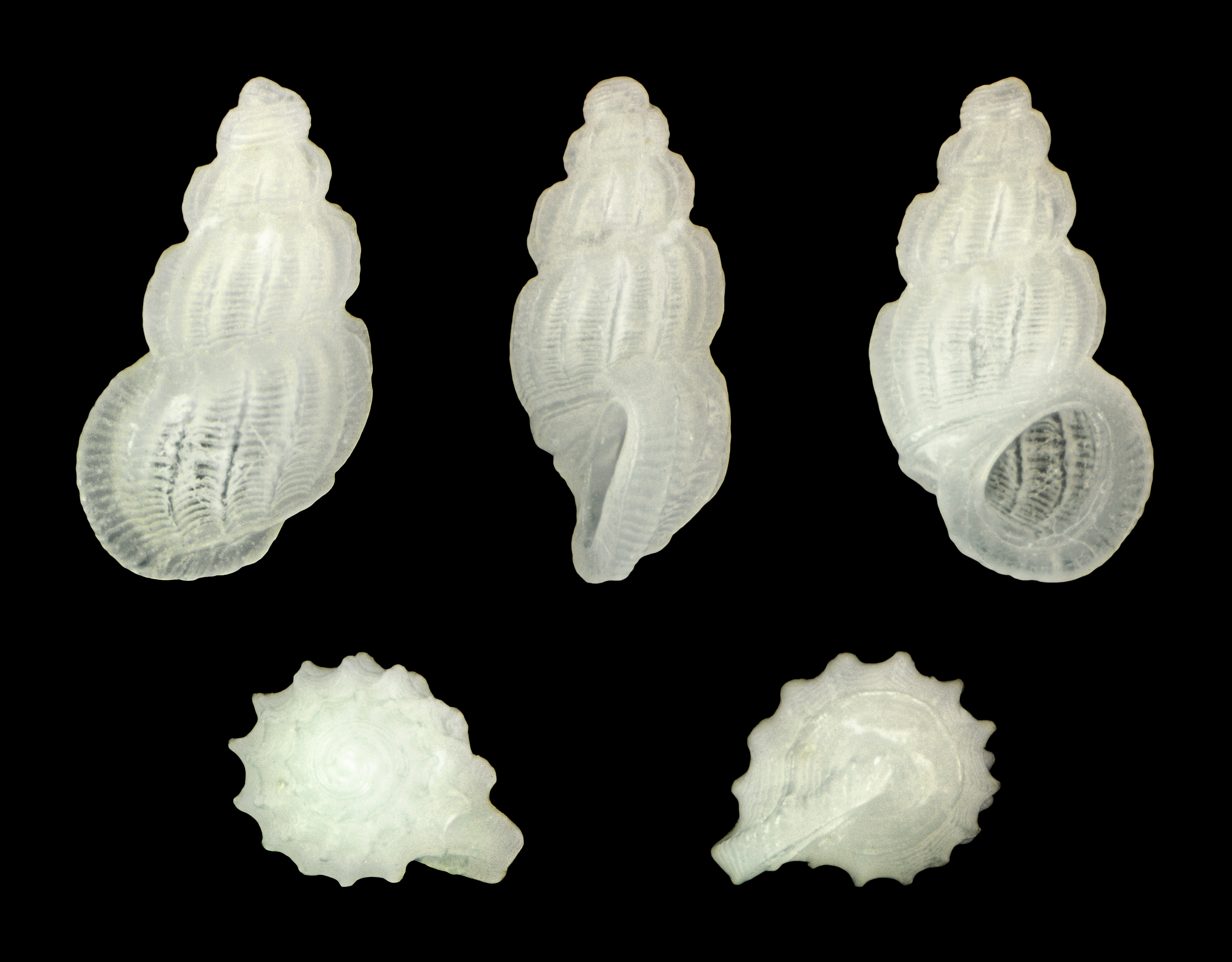

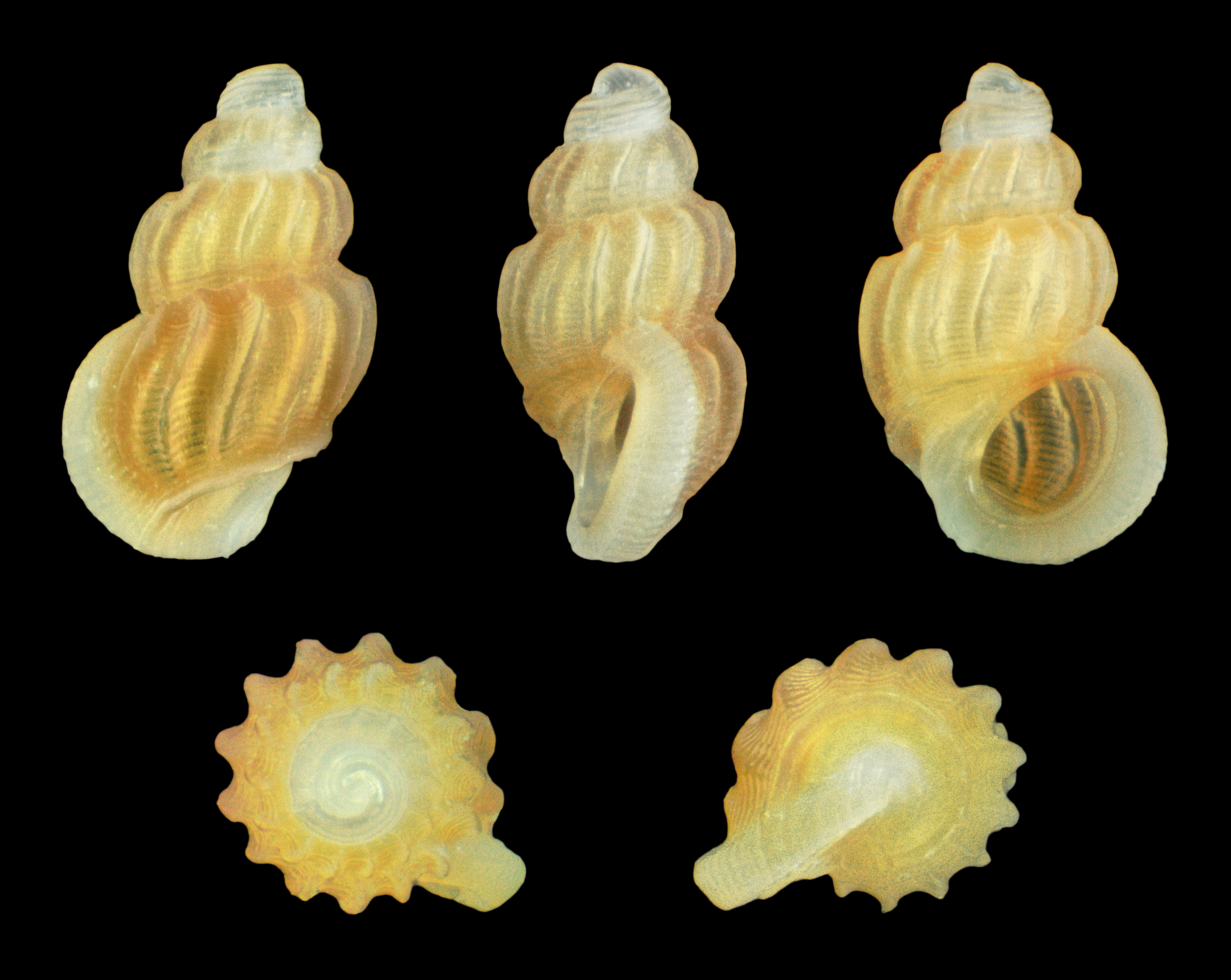

Scientific classification
- Kingdom: Animalia
- Phylum: Mollusca
- Class: Gastropoda
- Subclass: Caenogastropoda
- Order: Littorinimorpha
- Family: Rissoidae
- Genus: Manzonia
- Species: M. overdiepi

Binomial name
- Manzonia overdiepi van Aartsen, 1983

= Manzonia overdiepi =

Species of gastropod

Manzonia overdiepi is a species of minute sea snail, a marine gastropod mollusc or micromollusc in the family Rissoidae.
