= Manzonia segadei =

Scientific classification
- Kingdom: Animalia
- Phylum: Mollusca
- Class: Gastropoda
- Subclass: Caenogastropoda
- Order: Littorinimorpha
- Family: Rissoidae
- Genus: Manzonia
- Species: M. segadei

Binomial name
- Manzonia segadei Rolán, 1987

Species of gastropod

Manzonia segadei is a species of small sea snail, a marine gastropod mollusc or micromollusc in the family Rissoidae.

This species is native to:

- Cape Verde
- North Atlantic Ocean

No other species are listed as such.
