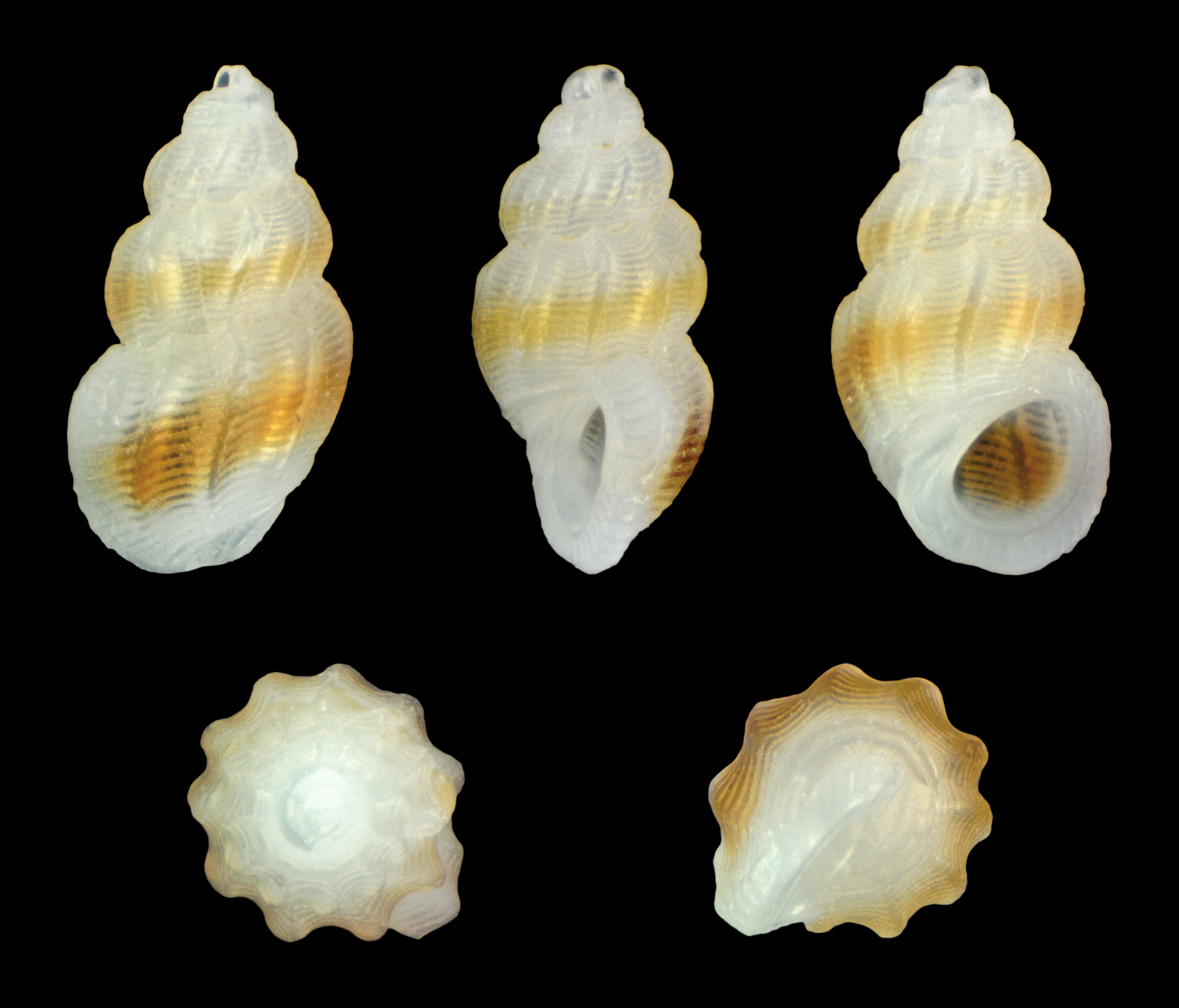

Scientific classification
- Kingdom: Animalia
- Phylum: Mollusca
- Class: Gastropoda
- Subclass: Caenogastropoda
- Order: Littorinimorpha
- Family: Rissoidae
- Genus: Manzonia
- Species: M. unifasciata

Binomial name
- Manzonia unifasciata Dautzenberg, 1889

= Manzonia unifasciata =

Species of gastropod

Manzonia unifasciata is a species of minute sea snail, a marine gastropod mollusc or micromollusc in the family Rissoidae.
