= Manzonia xicoi =

Scientific classification
- Kingdom: Animalia
- Phylum: Mollusca
- Class: Gastropoda
- Subclass: Caenogastropoda
- Order: Littorinimorpha
- Family: Rissoidae
- Genus: Manzonia
- Species: M. xicoi

Binomial name
- Manzonia xicoi Rolán, 1987

Species of sea snail

Manzonia xicoi is a species of small sea snail, a marine gastropod mollusc or micromollusc in the family Rissoidae.
