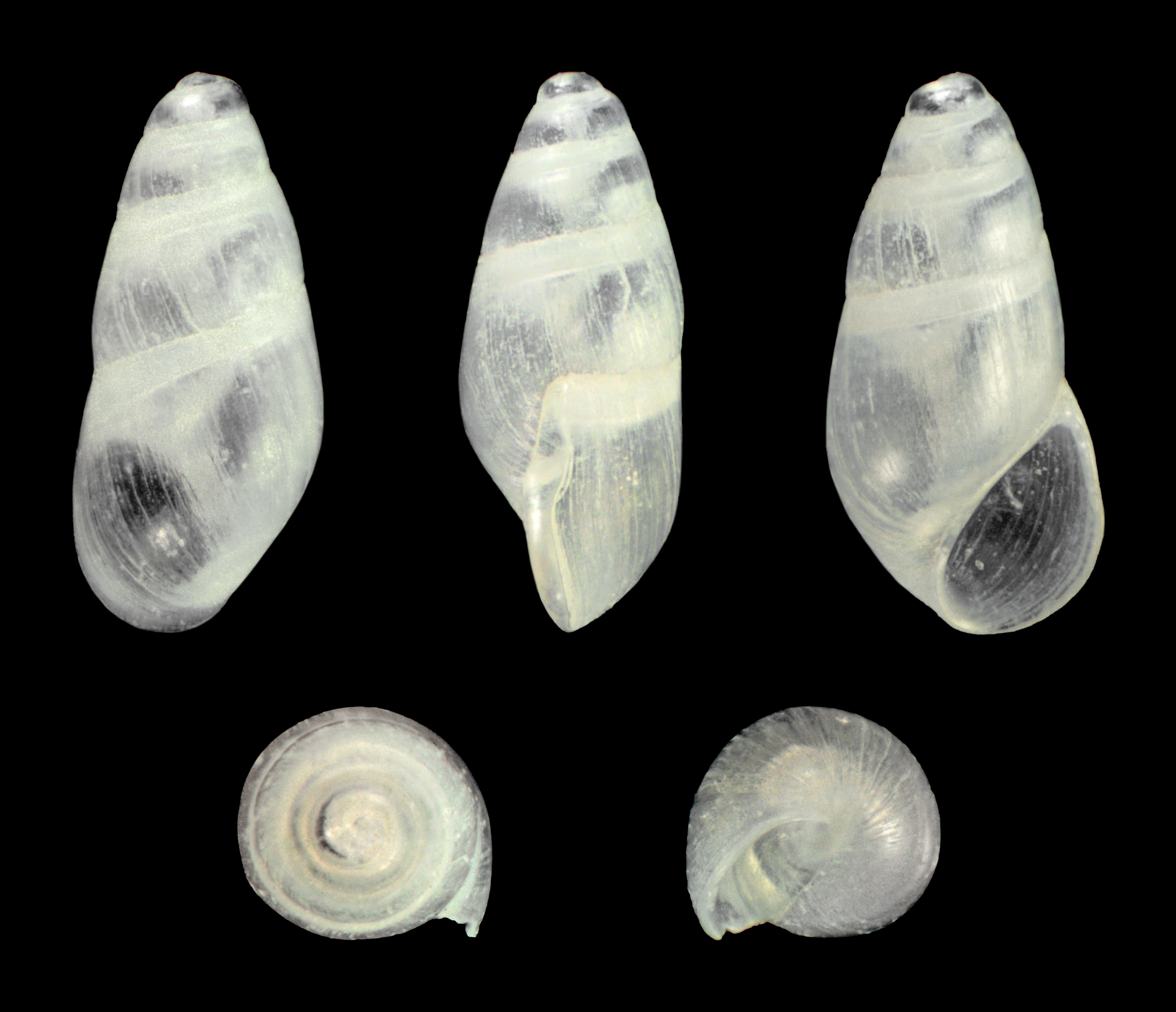

Scientific classification
- Kingdom: Animalia
- Phylum: Mollusca
- Class: Gastropoda
- Subclass: Caenogastropoda
- Order: Littorinimorpha
- Family: Rissoidae
- Genus: Botryphallus
- Species: B. epidauricus

Binomial name
- Botryphallus epidauricus (Brusina, 1866)

= Botryphallus epidauricus =

Species of gastropod

Botryphallus epidauricus is a species of minute sea snail, a marine gastropod mollusk or micromollusk in the family Rissoidae.
