= Porosalvania hydrobiaeformis =

Scientific classification
- Kingdom: Animalia
- Phylum: Mollusca
- Class: Gastropoda
- Subclass: Caenogastropoda
- Order: Littorinimorpha
- Family: Rissoidae
- Genus: Porosalvania
- Species: P. hydrobiaeformis

Binomial name
- Porosalvania hydrobiaeformis Gofas, 2007

Species of gastropod

Porosalvania hydrobiaeformis is a species of minute sea snail, a marine gastropod mollusk or micromollusk in the family Rissoidae.

== Description ==
This is a kind of sea snail
