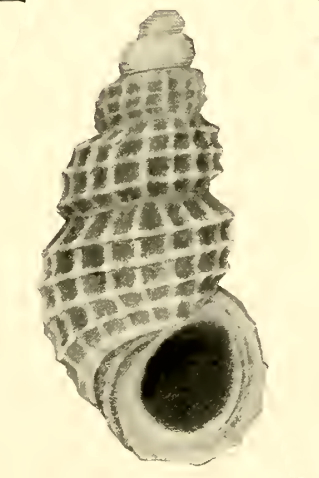
- Shell of Alvania aequisculpta

Scientific classification
- Kingdom: Animalia
- Phylum: Mollusca
- Class: Gastropoda
- Subclass: Caenogastropoda
- Order: Littorinimorpha
- Superfamily: Rissooidea
- Family: Rissoidae
- Genus: Alvania
- Species: A. aequisculpta

Binomial name
- Alvania aequisculpta Keep, 1887

Synonyms
- Alvinia aequisculpta (Keep, 1887); Manzonia aequisculpta (Keep, 1887); Rissoina aequisculpta (Keep, 1887)

= Alvania aequisculpta =

Species of gastropod

Alvania aequisculpta is a species of small sea snail, a marine gastropod mollusk or micromollusk in the family Rissoidae.

== Taxonomy ==
This and other Western American species were attributed to Alvinia Monterosato, 1884, following Keen (1971); nevertheless it is not proved to be more related to the Mediterranean type species Alvania weinkauffi Weinkauff, 1868 than to other Alvania s.l. and is therefore retained in Alvania.

== Description ==
The length of the shell varies between 5 mm and 10 mm.

(Original description) The minute shell is slender, and coarsely cancellated. The spire is five-whorled, and the aperture is circular and entire. Its color is white, and its length is only one-eighth of an inch.

The very elongate-conic shell is light yellow. The protoconch contains two, moderately well rounded whorls. They are marked by six spiral threads, which are about as wide as the spaces that separate them, and numerous slender, closely spaced, axial threads, which are about one-fourth as strong as the spiral threads between which they occur, giving the entire surface a finely reticulated appearance. The whorls of the teleoconch are appressed at the summit. They show a sloping shoulder which extends over the posterior fourth between the sutures, marked by strong, slightly retractive, axial ribs which are about one-fourth as wide as the spaces that separate them. Of these ribs, 14 occur upon the first, 16 upon the second, and 18 upon the penultimate whorl. In addition to the axial ribs, the whorls are marked between the sutures by three strong, spiral cords which are almost as strong as the ribs and divide the spaces between the sutures into four almost equal portions. The intersections of the spiral cords and the axial ribs form strong tubercles, while the spaces enclosed between them are well impressed, rectangular pits, having their long axes parallel with the spiral sculpture. The suture is strongly constricted. The periphery of the body whorl is marked by a spiral sulcus equal to that which separates the supraperipheral spiral cord from its posterior neighbor and, like it, is crossed by the continuations of the axial ribs, which extend over the first two basal spiral cords and render them tuberculate. The base of the shell is well rounded, rather short, produced anteriorly, and marked by three strong, sublamellar, spiral cords which are about one-third as wide as the spaces that separate them. The aperture is very oblique, twisted and ovate. The posterior angle is obtuse. The outer lip is thickened at the edge within the lip, re-enforced behind the edge by a strong varix. The inner lip is very stout, strongly curved, and appressed to the base. The parietal wall is covered with a very thick callus, which renders the peritreme complete.

== Distribution ==
This marine species occurs off Southeast USA; Bahamas; Cuba; Colombia.
