= Simulamerelina novemstriata =

Scientific classification
- Kingdom: Animalia
- Phylum: Mollusca
- Class: Gastropoda
- Subclass: Caenogastropoda
- Order: Littorinimorpha
- Family: Rissoidae
- Genus: Simulamerelina
- Species: S. novemstriata

Binomial name
- Simulamerelina novemstriata Faber & Moolenbeek, 2004

Species of gastropod

Simulamerelina novemstriata is a species of small sea snail, a marine gastropod mollusk or micromollusk in the family Rissoidae.

== Description ==
The maximum recorded shell length is 1.5 mm.

== Habitat ==
Minimum recorded depth is 0 m. Maximum recorded depth is 0 m.
