= Porosalvania vixplicata =

Scientific classification
- Kingdom: Animalia
- Phylum: Mollusca
- Class: Gastropoda
- Subclass: Caenogastropoda
- Order: Littorinimorpha
- Family: Rissoidae
- Genus: Porosalvania
- Species: P. vixplicata

Binomial name
- Porosalvania vixplicata Gofas, 2007

Species of gastropod

Porosalvania vixplicata is a species of minute sea snail, a marine gastropod mollusk or micromollusk in the family Rissoidae.
