= Manzonia boucheti =

Scientific classification
- Kingdom: Animalia
- Phylum: Mollusca
- Class: Gastropoda
- Subclass: Caenogastropoda
- Order: Littorinimorpha
- Family: Rissoidae
- Genus: Manzonia
- Species: M. boucheti

Binomial name
- Manzonia boucheti Amati, 1992

Species of gastropod

Manzonia boucheti is a species of sea snail in the family Rissoidae.

== Description ==
M. boucheti average about 2 mm (0.079 in) in length; they are considered a micromollusk. They are grazers and detritus feeders.

== Distribution ==
M. boucheti are found in the Canary Islands.
