= Botryphallus ovummuscae =

Scientific classification
- Kingdom: Animalia
- Phylum: Mollusca
- Class: Gastropoda
- Subclass: Caenogastropoda
- Order: Littorinimorpha
- Family: Rissoidae
- Genus: Botryphallus
- Species: B. ovummuscae

Binomial name
- Botryphallus ovummuscae (Gofas, 1990)

Species of gastropod

Botryphallus ovummuscae is a species of minute sea snail, a marine gastropod mollusk or micromollusk in the family Rissoidae.
