= Manzonia alexandrei =

Scientific classification
- Kingdom: Animalia
- Phylum: Mollusca
- Class: Gastropoda
- Subclass: Caenogastropoda
- Order: Littorinimorpha
- Family: Rissoidae
- Genus: Manzonia
- Species: M. alexandrei

Binomial name
- Manzonia alexandrei Gofas, 2010

Species of gastropod

Manzonia alexandrei is a species of minute sea snail, a marine gastropod mollusc or micromollusc in the family Rissoidae.
