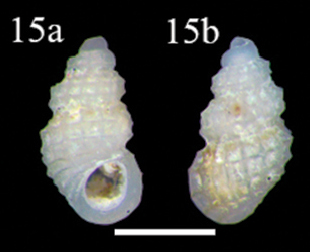

Scientific classification
- Kingdom: Animalia
- Phylum: Mollusca
- Class: Gastropoda
- Subclass: Caenogastropoda
- Order: Littorinimorpha
- Family: Rissoidae
- Genus: Simulamerelina
- Species: S. caribaea

Binomial name
- Simulamerelina caribaea (d’Orbigny, 1842)

= Simulamerelina caribaea =

Species of gastropod

Simulamerelina caribaea is a species of small sea snail, a marine gastropod mollusk or micromollusk in the family Rissoidae.

== Description ==
The maximum recorded shell length is 3 mm.

== Habitat ==
Minimum recorded depth is 0 m. Maximum recorded depth is 23 m.
