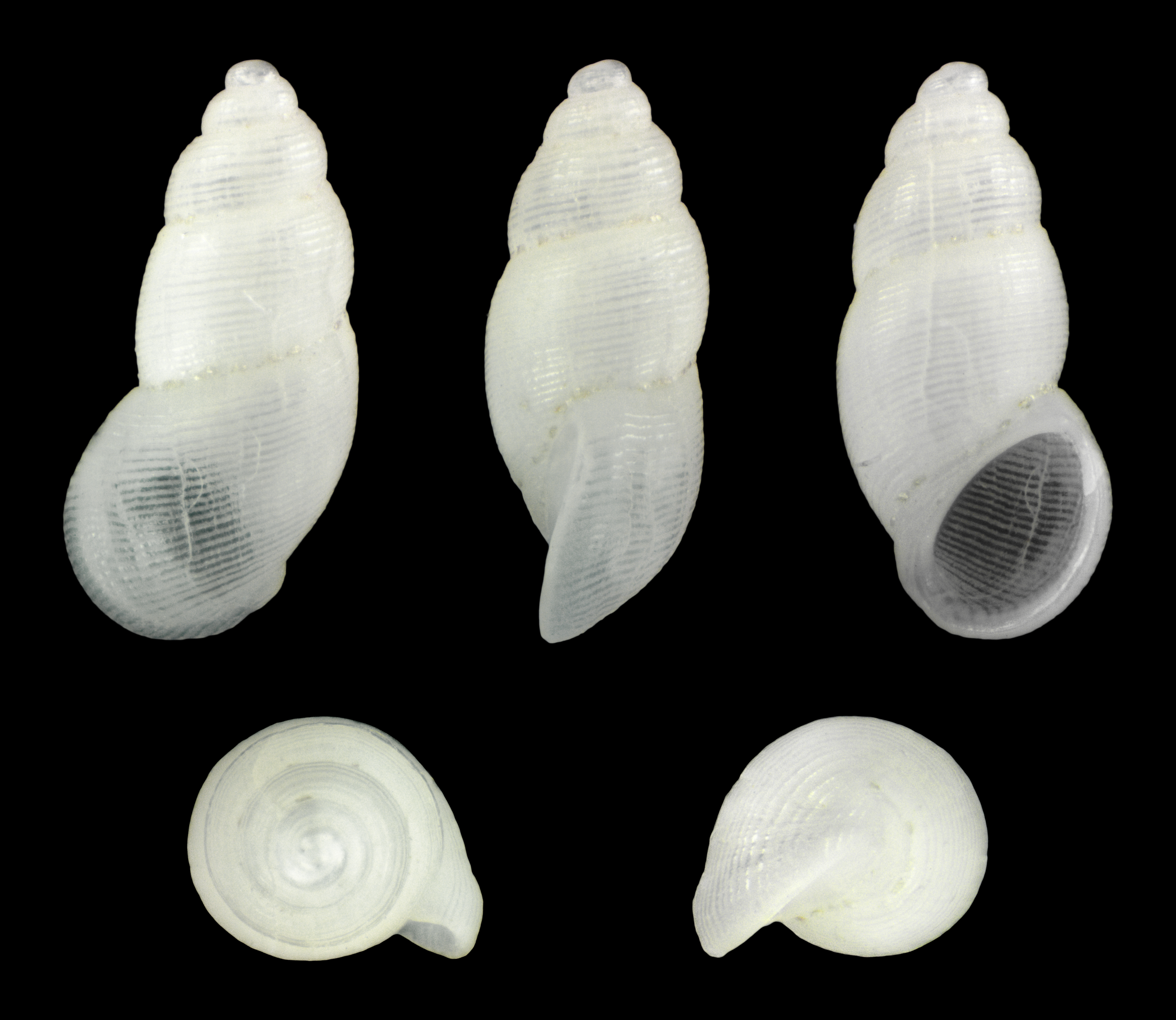

Scientific classification
- Kingdom: Animalia
- Phylum: Mollusca
- Class: Gastropoda
- Subclass: Caenogastropoda
- Order: Littorinimorpha
- Family: Rissoidae
- Genus: Manzonia
- Species: M. manzoniana

Binomial name
- Manzonia manzoniana (Rolán, 1987)

Synonyms
- Onoba manzoniana Rolán, 1987

= Manzonia manzoniana =

Species of gastropod

Manzonia manzoniana is a species of small sea snail, a marine gastropod mollusc or micromollusc in the family Rissoidae.
