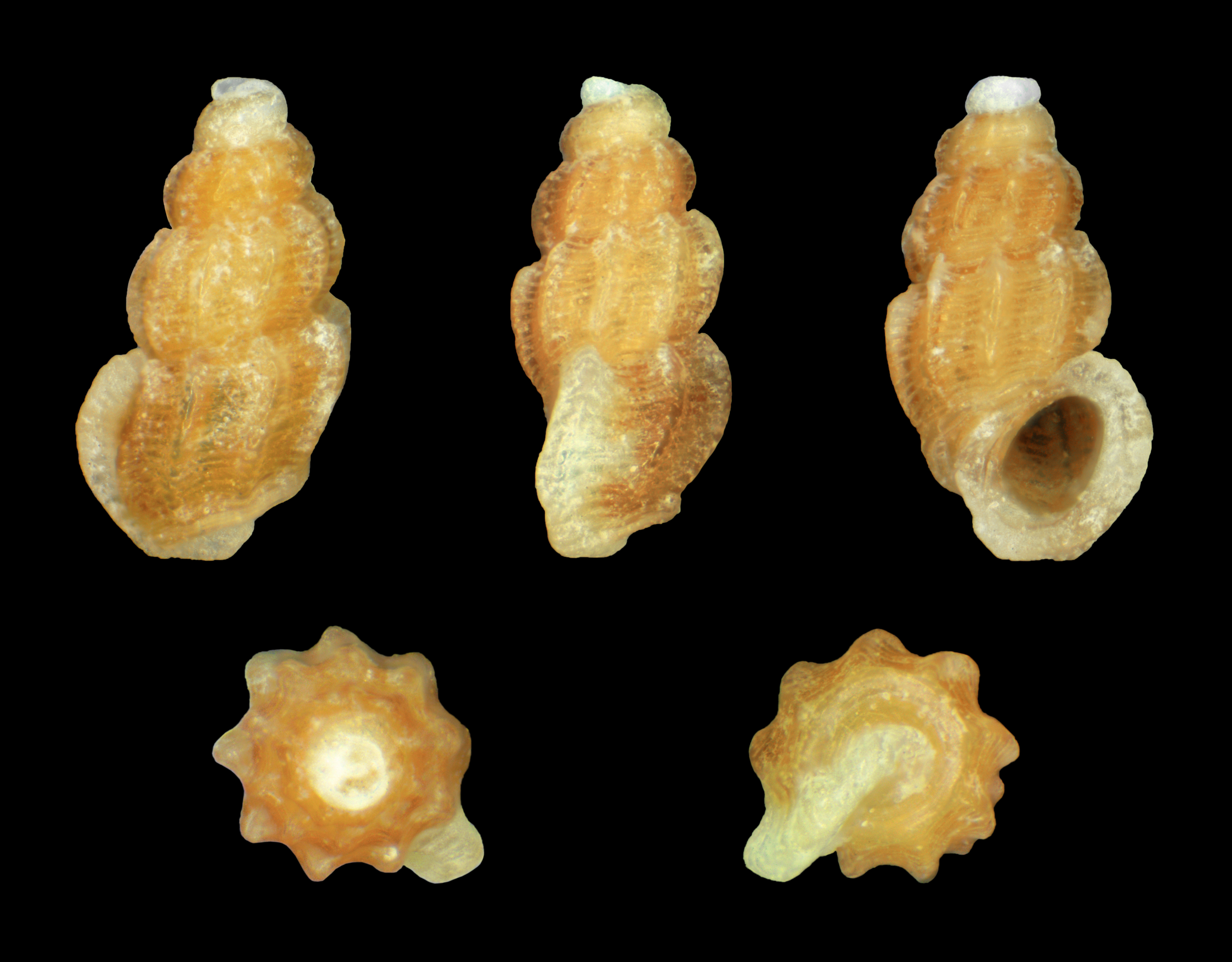

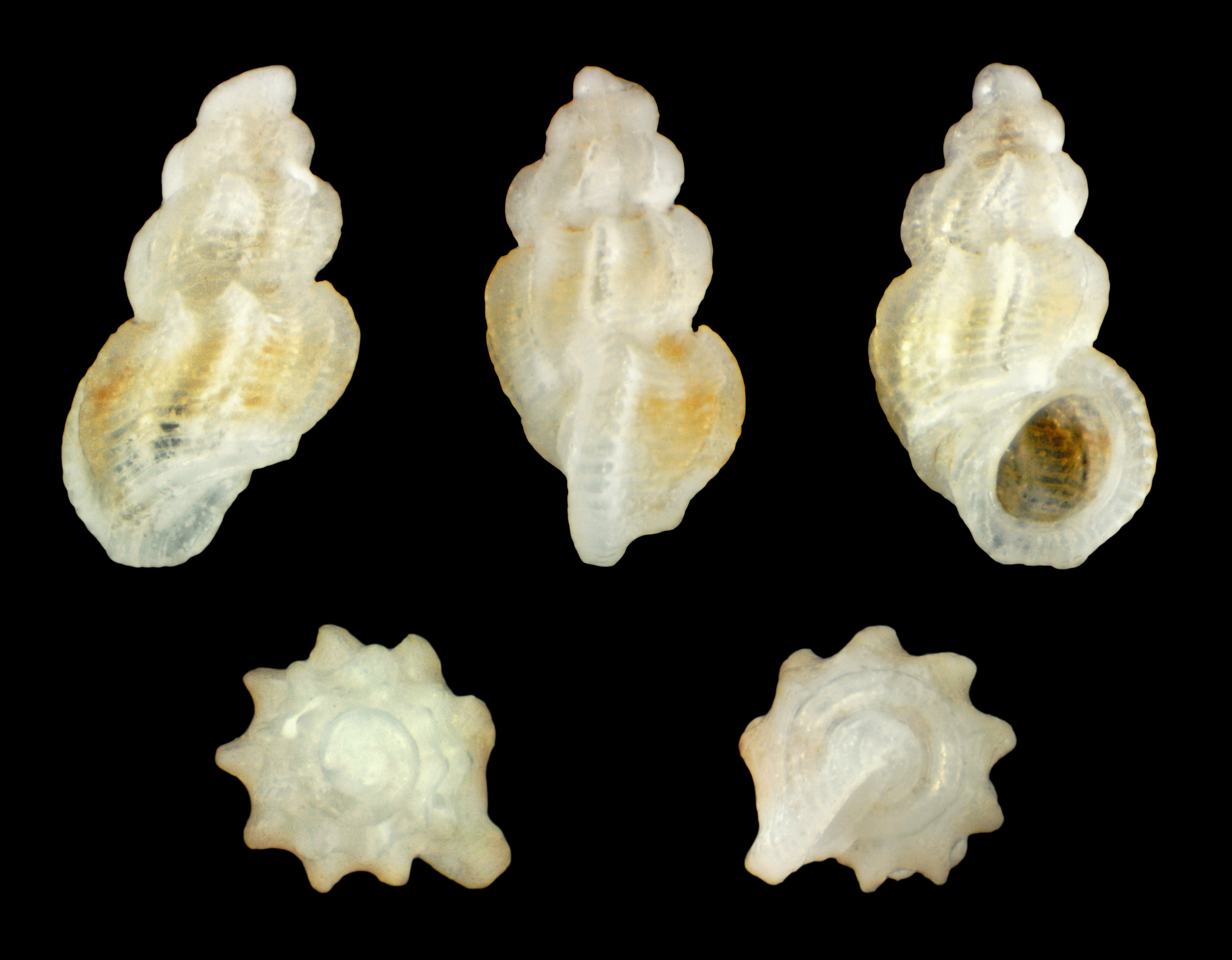

Scientific classification
- Kingdom: Animalia
- Phylum: Mollusca
- Class: Gastropoda
- Subclass: Caenogastropoda
- Order: Littorinimorpha
- Family: Rissoidae
- Genus: Manzonia
- Species: M. castanea

Binomial name
- Manzonia castanea Moolenbeek & Faber, 1987

= Manzonia castanea =

Species of gastropod

Manzonia castanea is a species of minute sea snail, a marine gastropod mollusc or micromollusc in the family Rissoidae.
