= Manzonia vigoensis =

Scientific classification
- Kingdom: Animalia
- Phylum: Mollusca
- Class: Gastropoda
- Subclass: Caenogastropoda
- Order: Littorinimorpha
- Family: Rissoidae
- Genus: Manzonia
- Species: M. vigoensis

Binomial name
- Manzonia vigoensis (Rolán, 1983)

Species of gastropod

Manzonia vigoensis is a species of minute sea snail, a marine gastropod mollusc or micromollusc in the family Rissoidae.

== Description ==
Manzonia vigoensis has a shell size up to 1.6 mm. It is found in the Bay of Biscay and the coast of Portugal and Galicia.
