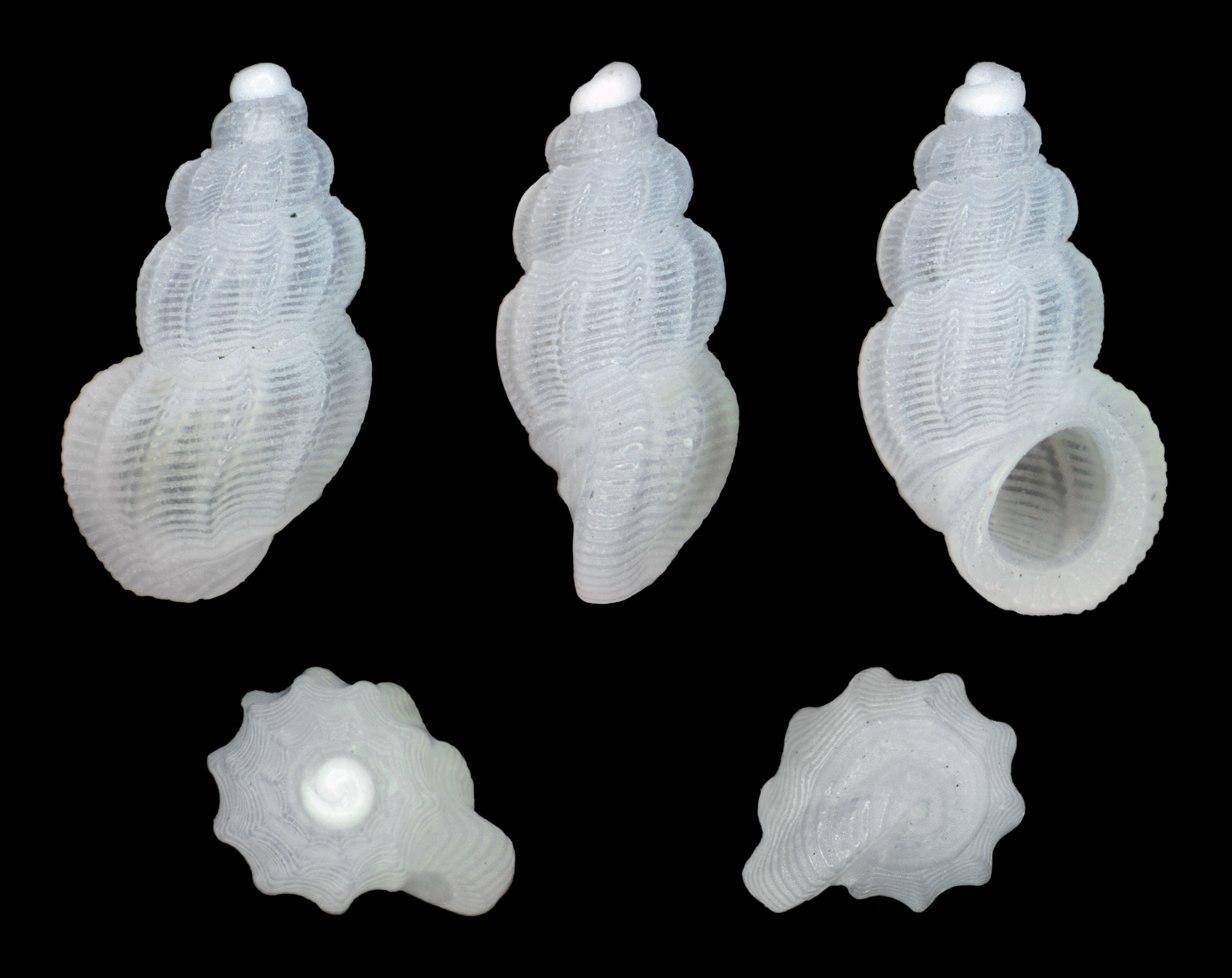

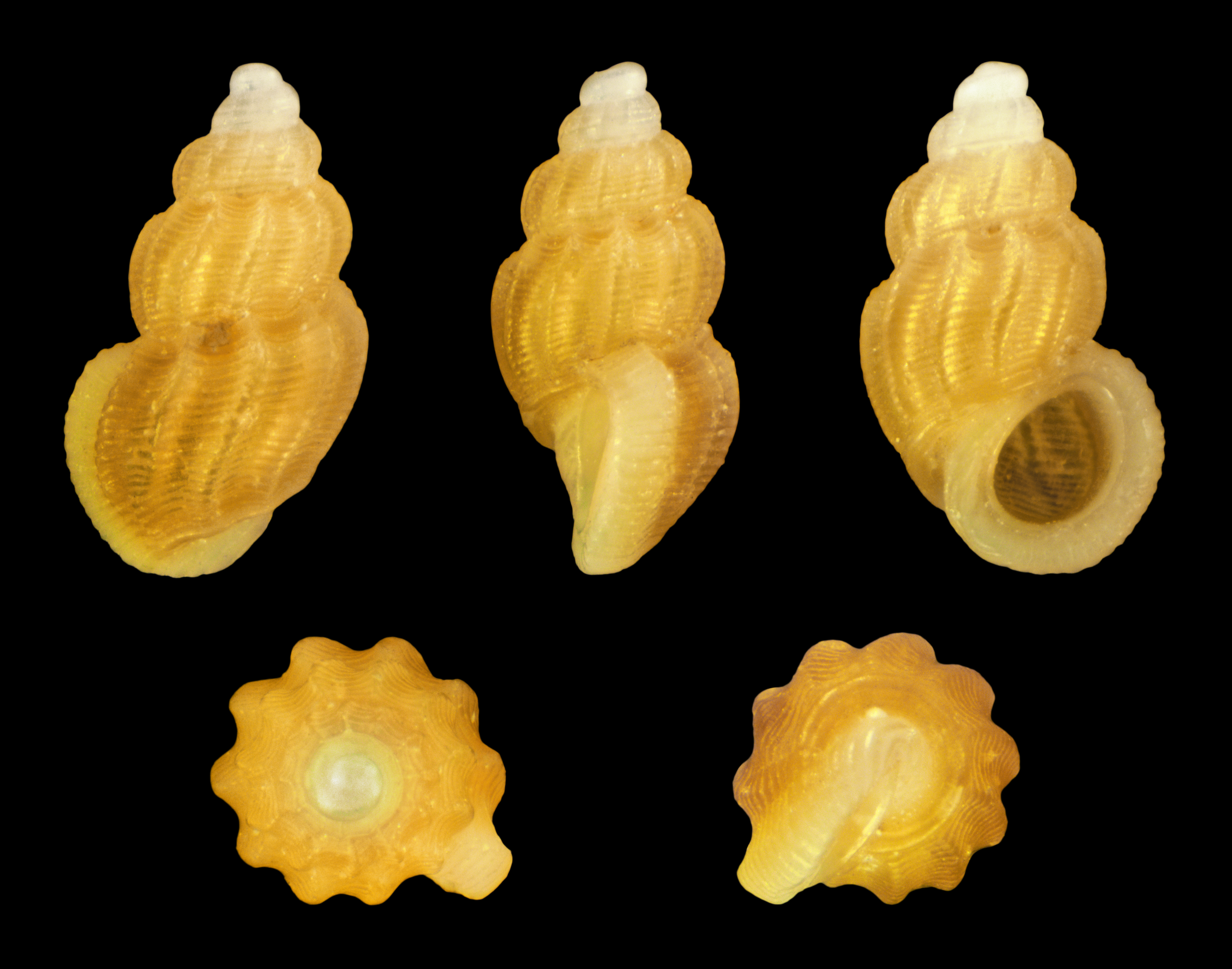

Scientific classification
- Kingdom: Animalia
- Phylum: Mollusca
- Class: Gastropoda
- Subclass: Caenogastropoda
- Order: Littorinimorpha
- Family: Rissoidae
- Genus: Manzonia
- Species: M. wilmae

Binomial name
- Manzonia wilmae Moolenbeek & Faber, 1987

= Manzonia wilmae =

Species of gastropod

Manzonia wilmae is a species of minute sea snail, a marine gastropod mollusc or micromollusc in the family Rissoidae.

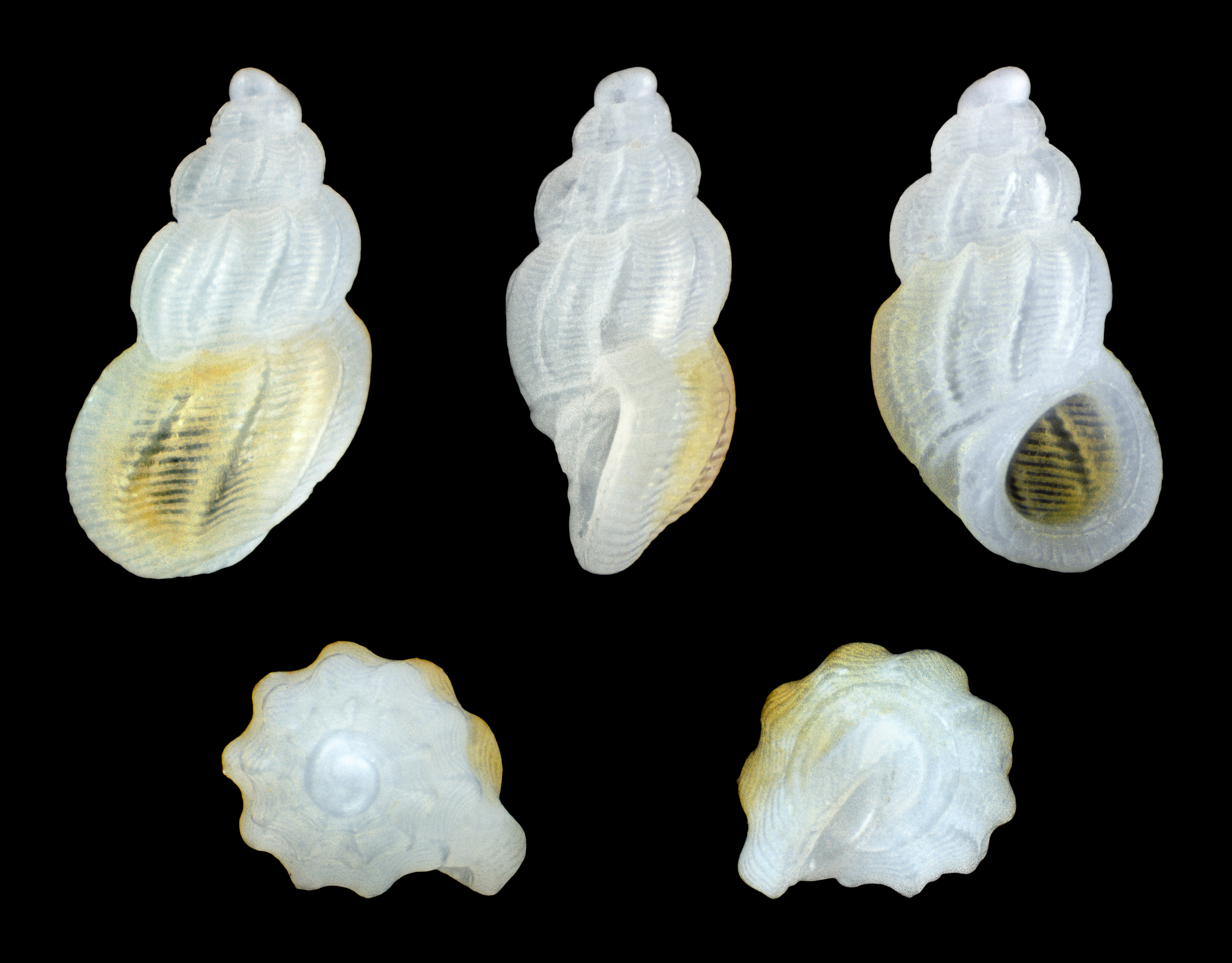
Two-coloured form
