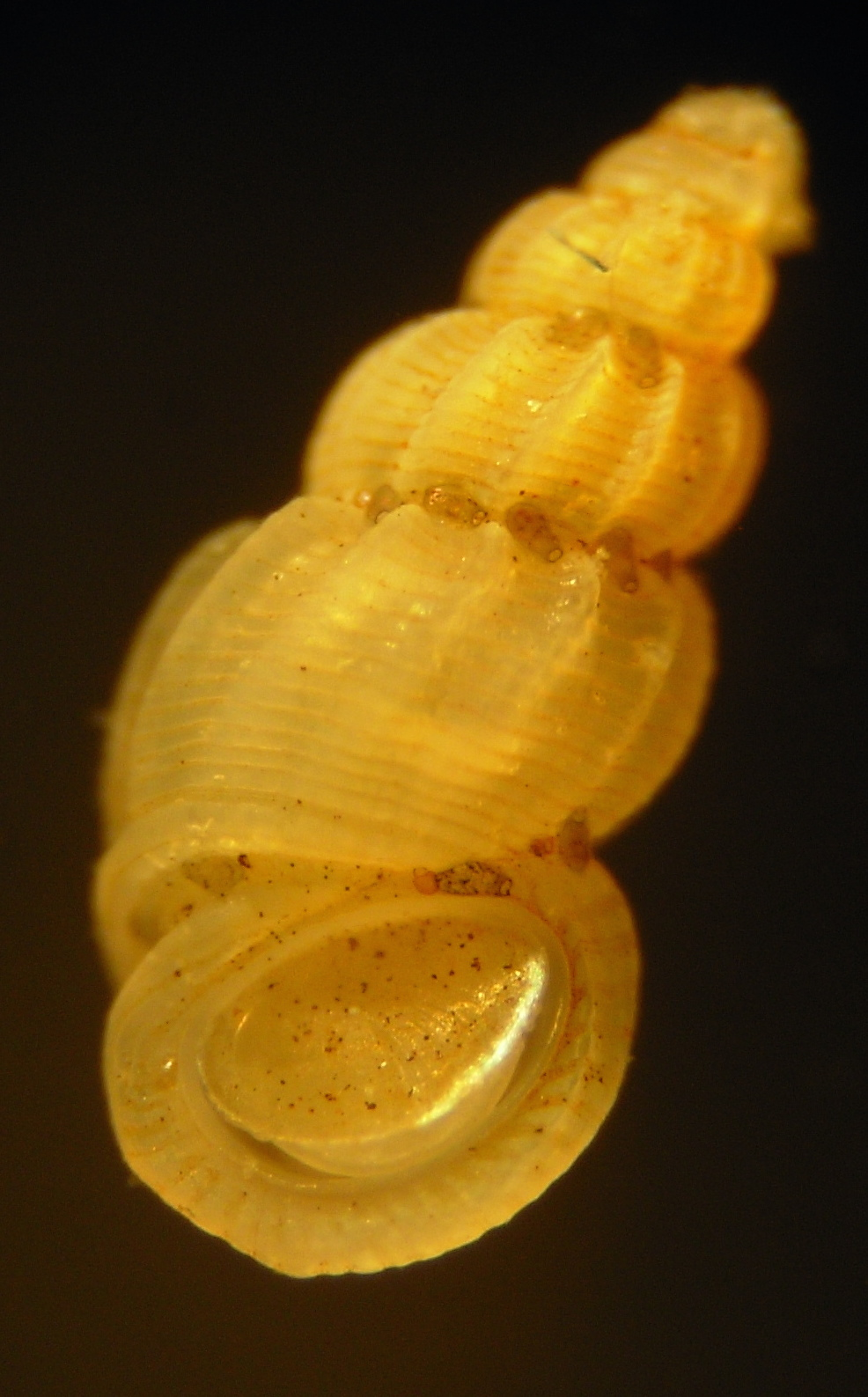

Scientific classification
- Kingdom: Animalia
- Phylum: Mollusca
- Class: Gastropoda
- Subclass: Caenogastropoda
- Order: Littorinimorpha
- Family: Rissoidae
- Genus: Manzonia
- Species: M. crassa

Binomial name
- Manzonia crassa (Kanmacher, 1798)

Synonyms
- Rissoa costata (J. Adams, 1796)<

= Manzonia crassa =

Species of gastropod

Manzonia crassa is a species of small sea snail, a marine gastropod mollusc or micromollusc in the family Rissoidae.

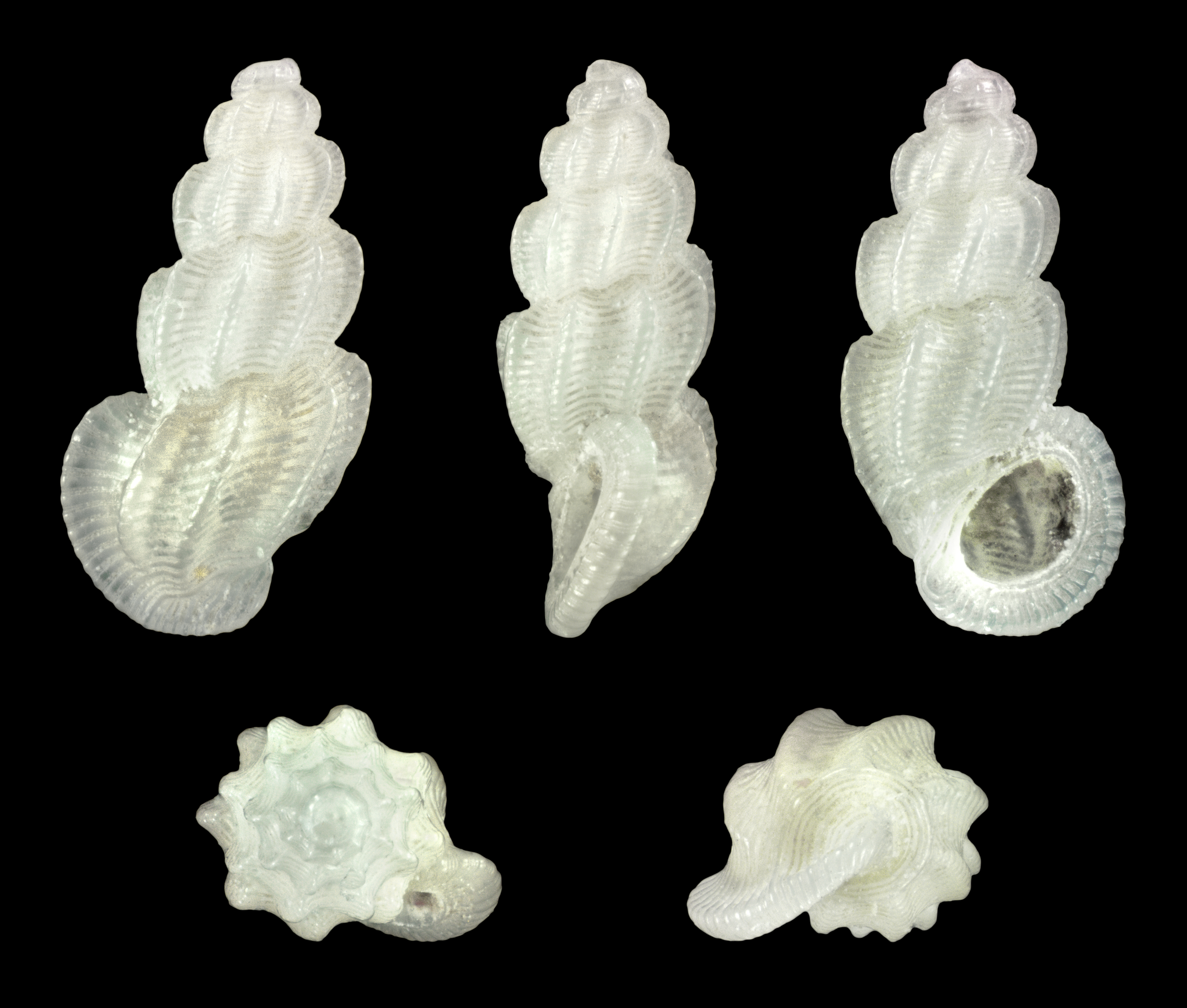
Manzonia crassa f. exigua
