= Amphirissoa cyclostomoides =

Scientific classification
- Kingdom: Animalia
- Phylum: Mollusca
- Class: Gastropoda
- Subclass: Caenogastropoda
- Order: Littorinimorpha
- Family: Rissoidae
- Genus: Amphirissoa
- Species: A. cyclostomoides

Binomial name
- Amphirissoa cyclostomoides Dautzenberg & Fischer H., 1897

Species of gastropod

Amphirissoa cyclostomoides is a species of minute sea snail, a marine gastropod mollusk or micromollusk in the family Rissoidae.
