= Manzonia lusitanica =

Scientific classification
- Kingdom: Animalia
- Phylum: Mollusca
- Class: Gastropoda
- Subclass: Caenogastropoda
- Order: Littorinimorpha
- Family: Rissoidae
- Genus: Manzonia
- Species: M. lusitanica

Binomial name
- Manzonia lusitanica Gofas, 2007

Species of gastropod

Manzonia lusitanica is a species of minute sea snail, a marine gastropod mollusc or micromollusc in the family Rissoidae.

== Distribution ==
Gorringe seamount, endemic, moderately common in 96-485 m depth.
