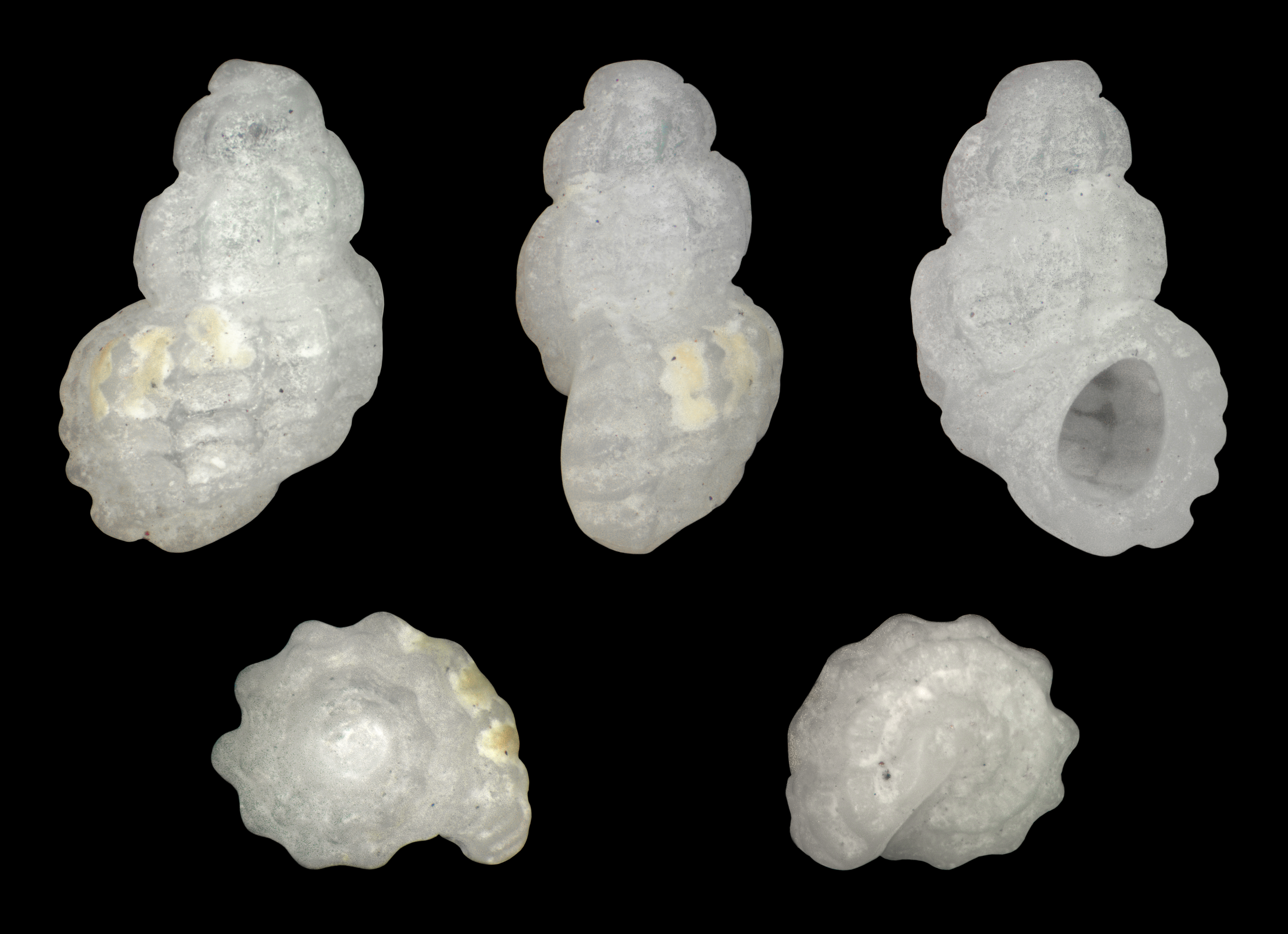

Scientific classification
- Kingdom: Animalia
- Phylum: Mollusca
- Class: Gastropoda
- Subclass: Caenogastropoda
- Order: Littorinimorpha
- Family: Rissoidae
- Genus: Manzonia
- Species: M. darwini

Binomial name
- Manzonia darwini Moolenbeek & Faber, 1987

= Manzonia darwini =

Species of gastropod

Manzonia darwini is a species of small sea snail, a marine gastropod mollusc or micromollusc in the family Rissoidae.

The species is named after the 19th century naturalist Charles Darwin.
