= Manzonia carboverdensis =

Scientific classification
- Kingdom: Animalia
- Phylum: Mollusca
- Class: Gastropoda
- Subclass: Caenogastropoda
- Order: Littorinimorpha
- Family: Rissoidae
- Genus: Manzonia
- Species: M. carboverdensis

Binomial name
- Manzonia carboverdensis Rolán, 1987

Species of gastropod

Manzonia carboverdensis is a species of small sea snail, a marine gastropod mollusc or micromollusc in the family Rissoidae.
