= Gofasia galiciae =

Scientific classification
- Kingdom: Animalia
- Phylum: Mollusca
- Class: Gastropoda
- Subclass: Caenogastropoda
- Order: Littorinimorpha
- Family: Rissoidae
- Genus: Gofasia
- Species: G. galiciae

Binomial name
- Gofasia galiciae Bouchet & Warén, 1993

Species of gastropod

Gofasia galiciae is a species of small sea snail, a marine gastropod mollusc or micromollusc in the family Rissoidae.
