= Porosalvania profundior =

Scientific classification
- Kingdom: Animalia
- Phylum: Mollusca
- Class: Gastropoda
- Subclass: Caenogastropoda
- Order: Littorinimorpha
- Family: Rissoidae
- Genus: Porosalvania
- Species: P. profundior

Binomial name
- Porosalvania profundior Gofas, 2007

Species of sea snail

Porosalvania profundior is a species of small sea snail, a marine gastropod mollusk or micromollusk in the family Rissoidae.
