= Quarkia sculpturata =

Scientific classification
- Kingdom: Animalia
- Phylum: Mollusca
- Class: Gastropoda
- Subclass: Caenogastropoda
- Order: Littorinimorpha
- Family: Rissoidae
- Genus: Quarkia
- Species: Q. sculpturata

Binomial name
- Quarkia sculpturata Faber, 2009

Species of gastropod

Quarkia sculpturata is a species of minute sea snail, a marine gastropod mollusk or micromollusk in the family Rissoidae.
