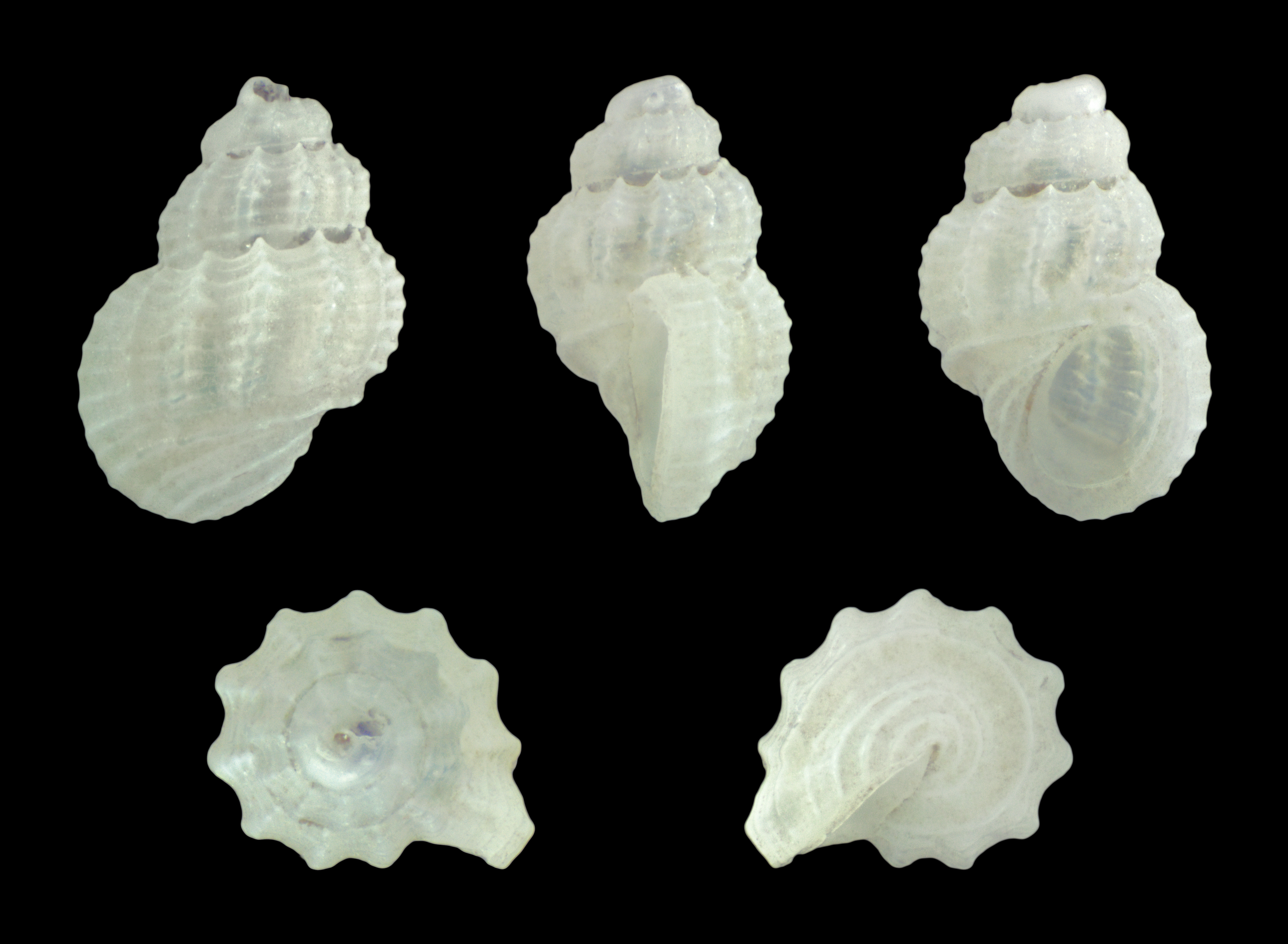

Scientific classification
- Kingdom: Animalia
- Phylum: Mollusca
- Class: Gastropoda
- Subclass: Caenogastropoda
- Order: Littorinimorpha
- Family: Rissoidae
- Genus: Manzonia
- Species: M. crispa

Binomial name
- Manzonia crispa (Watson, 1873)

= Manzonia crispa =

Species of gastropod

Manzonia crispa is a species of small sea snail, a marine gastropod mollusc or micromollusc in the family Rissoidae.

== Distribution ==
Manzonia crispa can be located not too far off the coast of Madeira.
