= Plagyostila asturiana =

Scientific classification
- Kingdom: Animalia
- Phylum: Mollusca
- Class: Gastropoda
- Subclass: Caenogastropoda
- Order: Littorinimorpha
- Family: Rissoidae
- Genus: Plagyostila
- Species: P. asturiana

Binomial name
- Plagyostila asturiana P. Fischer in de Folin, 1872

Synonyms
- Plagiostyla asturiana P.Fischer, 1872<

Species of gastropod

Plagyostila asturiana is a species of small sea snail, a marine gastropod mollusk or micromollusk in the family Rissoidae.
