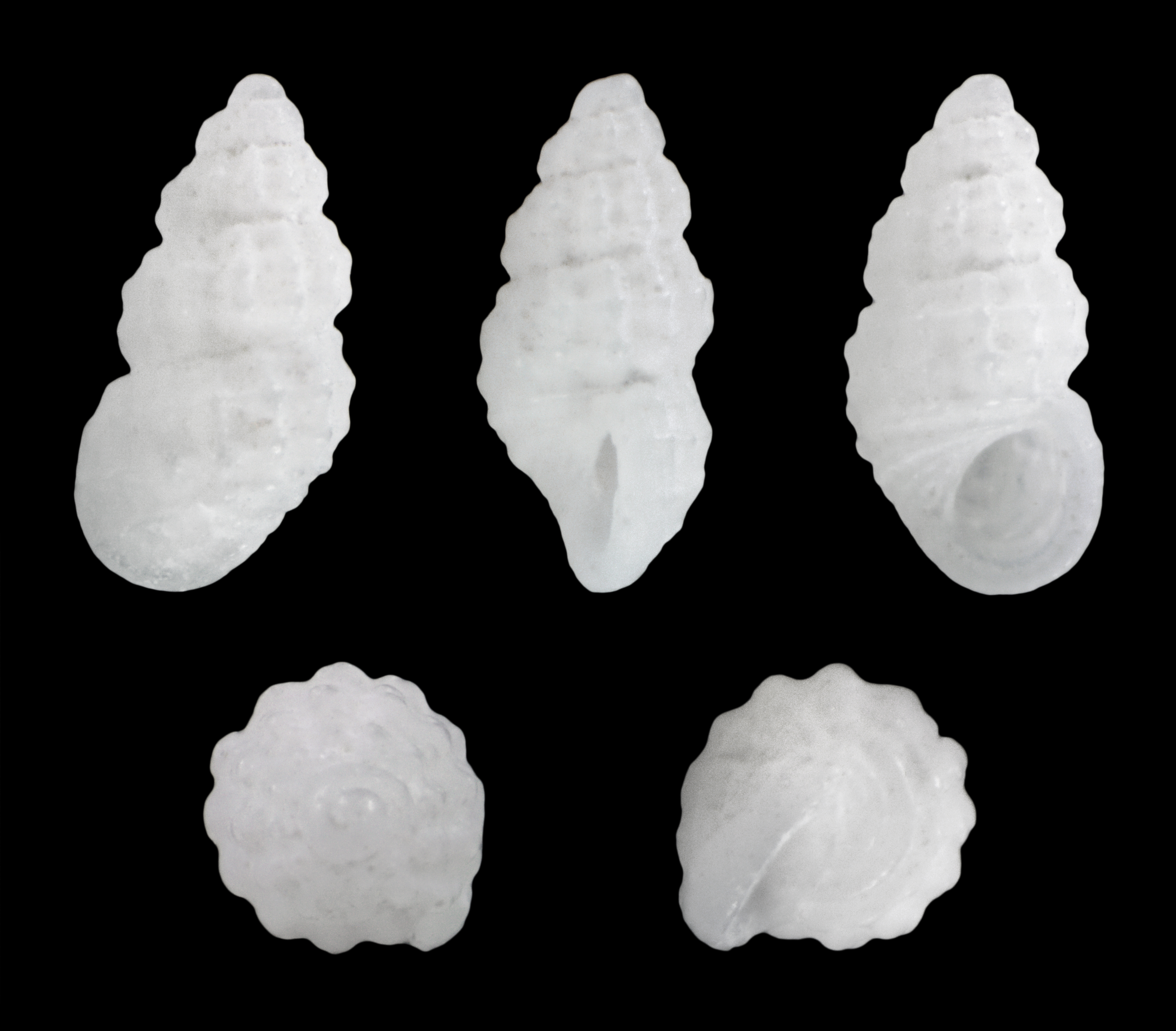
- Simulamerelina mauritiana (Martens, 1880)

Scientific classification
- Kingdom: Animalia
- Phylum: Mollusca
- Class: Gastropoda
- Subclass: Caenogastropoda
- Order: Littorinimorpha
- Family: Rissoidae
- Genus: Simulamerelina; Ponder, 1985

Type species
- Simulamerelina corruga (Laseron, 1956)

Synonyms
- Alvania (Simulamerelina) Ponder, 1985; Manzonia (Simulamerelina) Ponder, 1985

= Simulamerelina =

Genus of gastropods

Simulamerelina is a genus of minute sea snails, marine gastropod mollusks or micromollusks in the family Rissoidae.

== Species ==
Species within the genus Simulamerelina include:

- † Simulamerelina andraldensis (Lozouet, 1998)
- Simulamerelina australes Amati, Di Giulio & Oliverio, 2023
- Simulamerelina bermudensis (Faber & Moolenbeek, 1987)
- † Simulamerelina boucheti (Lozouet, 1998)
- Simulamerelina caribaea (d’Orbigny, 1842)
- Simulamerelina corruga (Laseron, 1956)
- Simulamerelina crassula (Rehder, 1980)
- Simulamerelina densestriata Amati, Di Giulio & Oliverio, 2023
- Simulamerelina didyma (Watson, 1886)
- † Simulamerelina falsimerelina (Lozouet, 1998)
- Simulamerelina ferruginea (A. Adams, 1861)
- Simulamerelina gemmata (A. W. B. Powell, 1927)
- Simulamerelina gracilis Amati, Di Giulio & Oliverio, 2023
- Simulamerelina granulosa (Pease, 1862)
- Simulamerelina guesti (Faber & Moolenbeek, 1987)
- Simulamerelina hewa (Kay, 1979)
- † Simulamerelina hortensis (Lozouet, 1998)
- Simulamerelina lepteseiras Amati, Di Giulio & Oliverio, 2023
- Simulamerelina longinqua (Rehder, 1980)
- Simulamerelina mauritiana (Martens, 1880)
- Simulamerelina micrometrica Amati, Di Giulio & Oliverio, 2023
- Simulamerelina novemstriata Faber & Moolenbeek, 2004
- Simulamerelina tokyoensis (Pilsbry, 1904)
- Simulamerelina tuamotu Amati, Di Giulio & Oliverio, 2023
- Simulamerelina wanawana (Kay, 1979)
