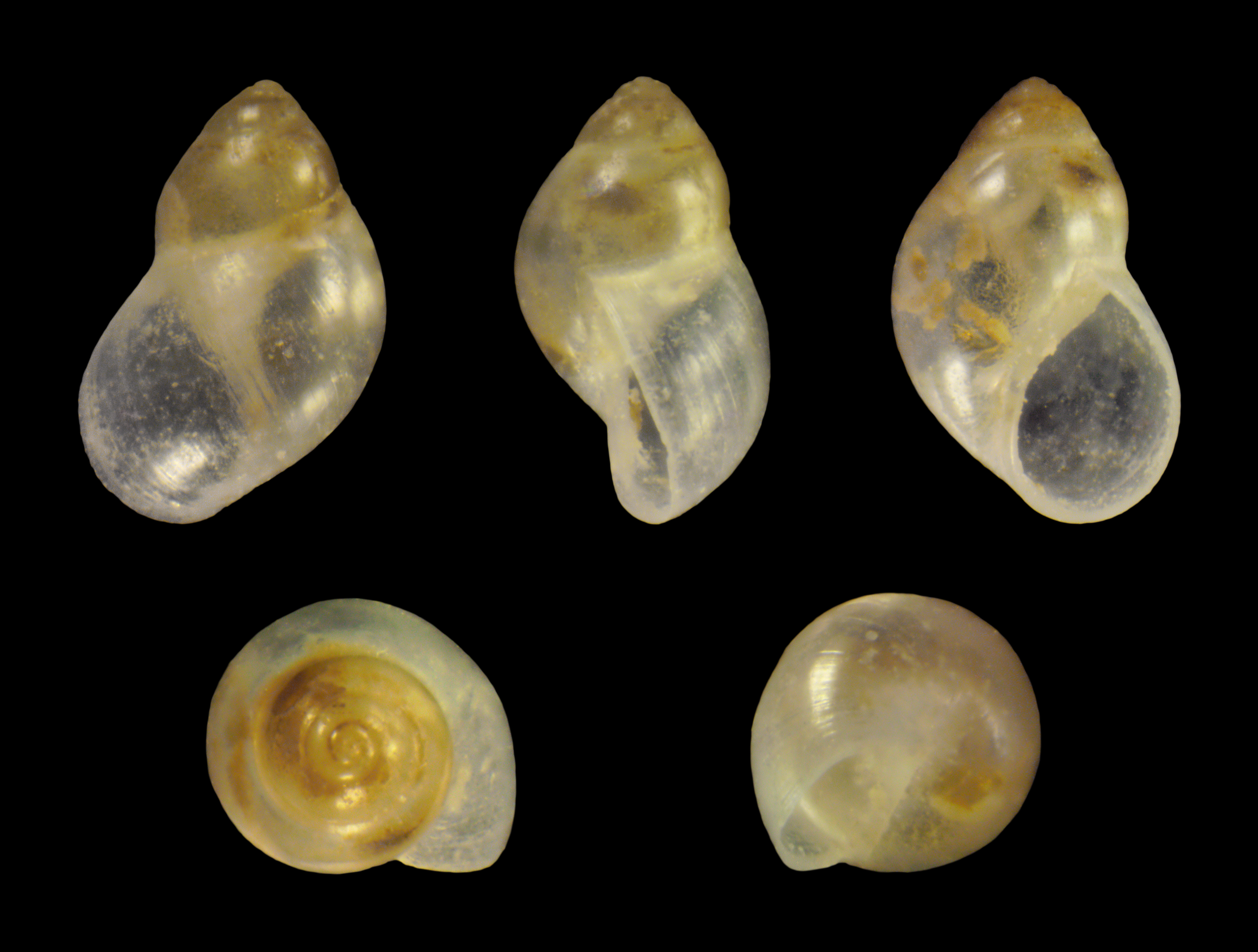
- Plagyostila spec.

Scientific classification
- Kingdom: Animalia
- Phylum: Mollusca
- Class: Gastropoda
- Subclass: Caenogastropoda
- Order: Littorinimorpha
- Family: Rissoidae
- Genus: Plagyostila; Folin, 1872

Synonyms
- Plagiostyla Fischer, 1872

= Plagyostila =

Genus of gastropods

Plagyostila is a genus of minute sea snails, marine gastropod mollusks or micromollusks in the family Rissoidae.

== Species ==
Species within the genus Plagyostila include:

- Plagyostila asturiana Fischer P. in de Folin, 1872
- Plagyostila senegalensis Rolán & Pelorce, 2002
