= Omanimerelina =

Scientific classification
- Kingdom: Animalia
- Phylum: Mollusca
- Class: Gastropoda
- Subclass: Caenogastropoda
- Order: Littorinimorpha
- Family: Rissoidae
- Genus: Omanimerelina; Moolenbeek & Bosch, 2007

Genus of gastropods

Omanimerelina is a genus of minute sea snails, marine gastropod mollusks or micromollusks in the family Rissoidae.

== Species ==
Species within the genus Omanimerelina include:

- Omanimerelina eloiseae Moolenbeek & Bosch, 2007
