= Archaschenia =

Scientific classification
- Domain: Eukaryota
- Kingdom: Animalia
- Phylum: Mollusca
- Class: Gastropoda
- Subclass: Caenogastropoda
- Order: Littorinimorpha
- Family: Rissoidae
- Genus: †Archaschenia; Zhgenti, 1981

Type species
- Archaschenia merklini Zhgenti, 1981

Extinct genus of mollusks

Archaschenia is an extinct genus of sea snails under the family Rissoidae.

== Species ==
The genus Archaschenia contains two scientifically accepted species:

- Archaschenia iljinae Zhgenti, 1981
- Archaschenia merklini Zhgenti, 1981
