= Ellenstrongia =

Scientific classification
- Kingdom: Animalia
- Phylum: Mollusca
- Class: Gastropoda
- Subclass: Caenogastropoda
- Order: Littorinimorpha
- Superfamily: Rissooidea
- Family: Rissoidae
- Genus: Ellenstrongia; Amati, Di Giulio & Oliverio, 2023

Type species
- Ellenstrongia tarasoc Amati, Di Giulio & Oliverio, 2023

Genus of gastropods

Ellenstrongia is a genus of minute sea snails, marine gastropod mollusks or micromollusks in the family Rissoidae.

== Species ==
- Ellenstrongia tarasoc Amati, Di Giulio & Oliverio, 2023
