= Porosalvania =

Scientific classification
- Kingdom: Animalia
- Phylum: Mollusca
- Class: Gastropoda
- Subclass: Caenogastropoda
- Order: Littorinimorpha
- Family: Rissoidae
- Genus: Porosalvania; Gofas, 2007

Genus of gastropods

Porosalvania is a genus of minute sea snails, marine gastropod molluscs or micromolluscs in the family Rissoidae.

== Species ==
Species within the genus Porosalvania include:

- Porosalvania angulifera Gofas, 2007
- Porosalvania decipiens Gofas, 2007
- Porosalvania diaphana Gofas, 2007
- Porosalvania hydrobiaeformis Gofas, 2007
- Porosalvania profundior Gofas, 2007
- Porosalvania semisculpta Gofas, 2007
- Porosalvania solidula Gofas, 2007
- Porosalvania vixplicata Gofas, 2007
