= Quarkia =

Scientific classification
- Kingdom: Animalia
- Phylum: Mollusca
- Class: Gastropoda
- Subclass: Caenogastropoda
- Order: Littorinimorpha
- Family: Rissoidae
- Genus: Quarkia; Faber, 2009

Genus of gastropods

Quarkia is a genus of minute sea snails, marine gastropod mollusks or micromollusks in the family Rissoidae.

== Species ==
Species within the genus Quarkia include:

- Quarkia sculpturata Faber, 2009
