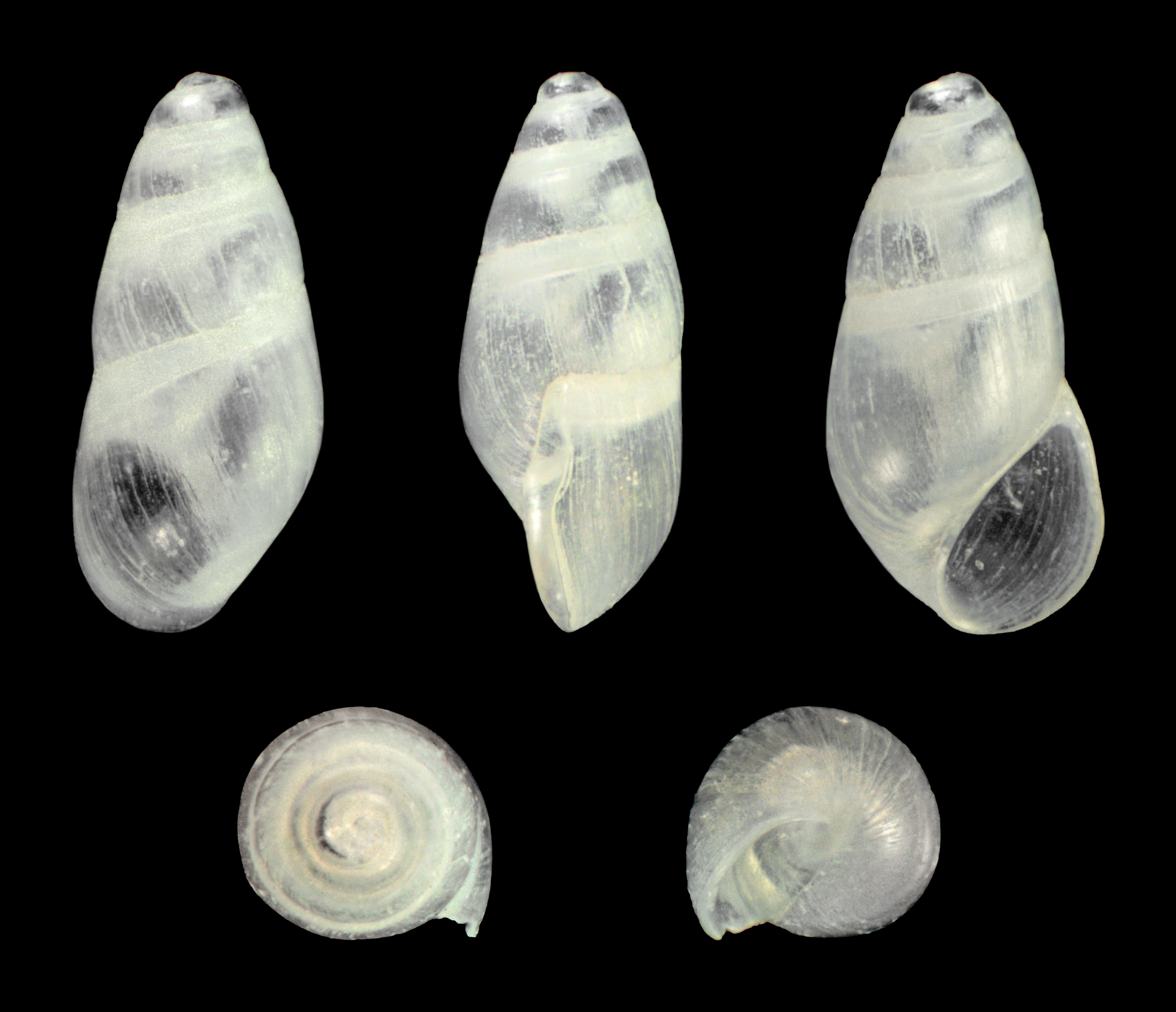
- Botryphallus epidauricus (Brusina, 1866)

Scientific classification
- Kingdom: Animalia
- Phylum: Mollusca
- Class: Gastropoda
- Subclass: Caenogastropoda
- Order: Littorinimorpha
- Family: Rissoidae
- Genus: Botryphallus; Ponder, 1990

= Botryphallus =

Genus of gastropods

Botryphallus is a genus of minute sea snails, marine gastropod mollusks or micromollusks in the family Rissoidae.

== Species ==
Species within the genus Botryphallus include:

- Botryphallus epidauricus (Brusina, 1866)
- Botryphallus ovummuscae (Gofas, 1990)
- Botryphallus tuber (Rolán, 1991)
