= Parashiela =

Scientific classification
- Kingdom: Animalia
- Phylum: Mollusca
- Class: Gastropoda
- Subclass: Caenogastropoda
- Order: Littorinimorpha
- Family: Rissoidae
- Genus: Parashiela; Laseron, 1956

Type species
- Parashiela ambulata Laseron, 1956

Genus of gastropods

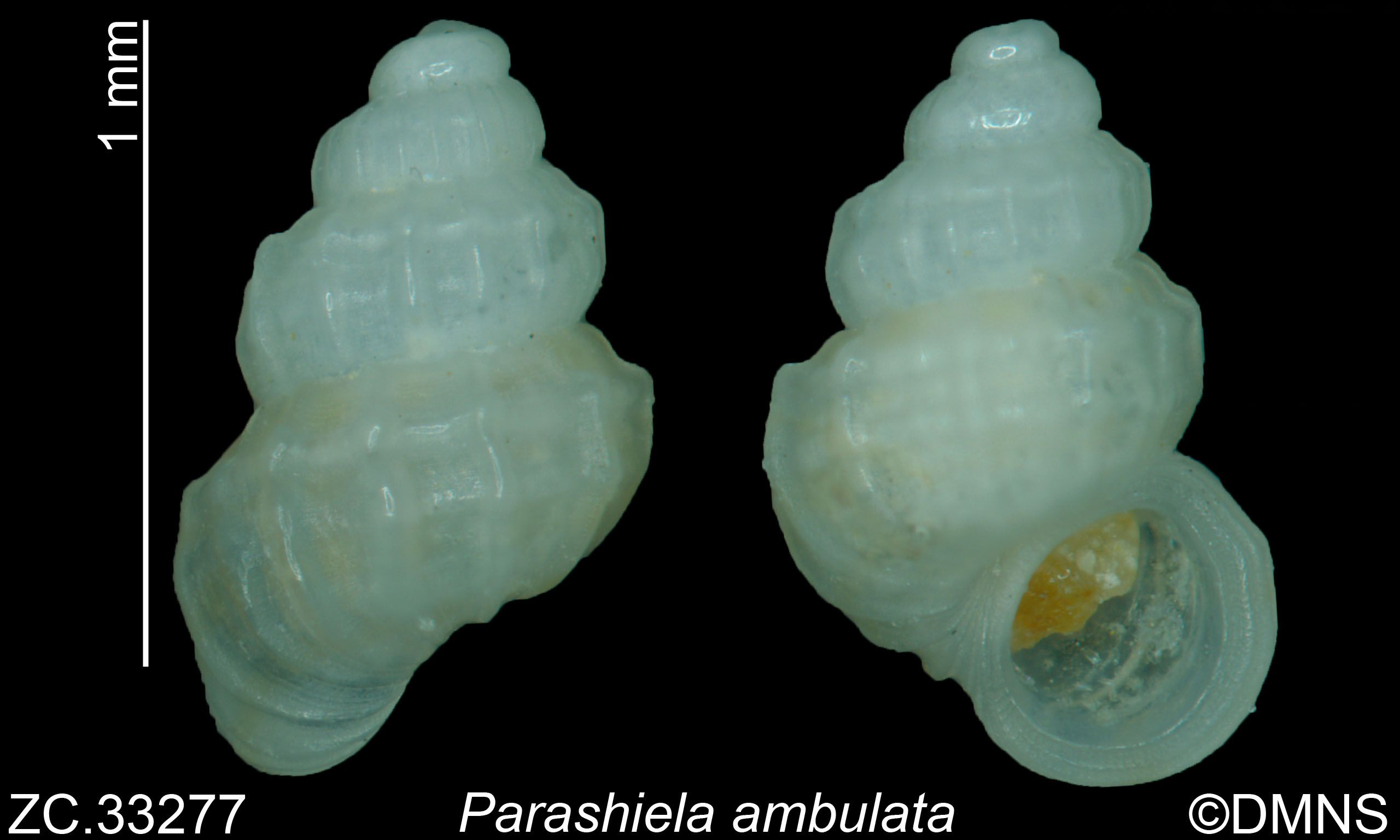
Parashiela ambulata, Kauai, Hawaii, USA

Parashiela is a genus of minute sea snails, marine gastropod mollusks or micromollusks in the family Rissoidae.

== Species ==
Species within the genus Parashiela include:

- Parashiela ambulata Laseron, 1956
- Parashiela caboverdensis Amati, Smriglio & Oliverio, 2024
- Parashiela expansilabrum Amati, Di Giulio & Oliverio, 2023
- Parashiela invisibilis (Hedley, 1899)
- Parashiela liddelliana (Hedley, 1907)
- Parashiela obesula Amati, Di Giulio & Oliverio, 2023
- Parashiela rimatara Amati, Di Giulio & Oliverio, 2023
- Parashiela rotundata Amati, Di Giulio & Oliverio, 2023
- Parashiela soniae Amati, Di Giulio & Oliverio, 2023

Synonyms

- Parashiela beetsi Ladd, 1966: synonym of Parashiela ambulata Laseron, 1956

== Distribution ==
This species is found along Japan and Australia.
