= Amphirissoa =

Scientific classification
- Kingdom: Animalia
- Phylum: Mollusca
- Class: Gastropoda
- Subclass: Caenogastropoda
- Order: Littorinimorpha
- Family: Rissoidae
- Genus: Amphirissoa; Dautzenberg & Fischer, 1897

Genus of gastropods

Amphirissoa is a genus of minute sea snails, marine gastropod mollusks or micromollusks in the family Rissoidae.

== Species ==
Species within the genus Amphirissoa include:

- Amphirissoa cyclostomoides Dautzenberg & Fischer H., 1897
