= Gofasia =

Scientific classification
- Kingdom: Animalia
- Phylum: Mollusca
- Class: Gastropoda
- Subclass: Caenogastropoda
- Order: Littorinimorpha
- Family: Rissoidae
- Genus: Gofasia; Bouchet & Warén, 1993

Genus of gastropods

Gofasia is a genus of minute sea snails, marine gastropod molluscs or micromolluscs in the family Rissoidae.

== Species ==
Species within the genus Gofasia include:

- Gofasia atlantidis Gofas, 2007
- Gofasia galiciae Bouchet & Warén, 1993
- Gofasia josephinae Bouchet & Warén, 1993
- Gofasia obtusellaeformis Gofas, 2007
- Gofasia tenuicula Gofas, 2007
- Gofasia vanderlandi Bouchet & Warén, 1993
- Gofasia vinyllina Gofas, 2007
