= Alvania purpurea =

Scientific classification
- Kingdom: Animalia
- Phylum: Mollusca
- Class: Gastropoda
- Subclass: Caenogastropoda
- Order: Littorinimorpha
- Superfamily: Rissooidea
- Family: Rissoidae
- Genus: Alvania
- Species: A. purpurea

Binomial name
- Alvania purpurea Dall, 1871

Synonyms
- Alvinia purpurea (Dall, 1871); Manzonia purpurea (Dall, 1871)

Species of gastropod

Alvania purpurea is a species of small sea snail, a marine gastropod mollusk or micromollusk in the family Rissoidae.

== Distribution ==
This species occurs in the Pacific Ocean off Monterey, California.

== Description ==
(Original description) The small shell consists of four rounded whorls that are rather pointed.

The sculpture consists of six or seven revolving ribs. On the body whorl, only two appear on the second whorl. The apical whorl is smooth. These ribs are crossed by about twenty longitudinal riblets, which do not pass the second revolving rib on the body whorl. On the antepenultimate whorl they reach from suture to suture, and are conspicuously angulated at their intersections with the two evolving ribs. The suture is deep. The aperture is rounded and is interrupted by the body whorl. The peristome is thickened, with a groove behind the columella.

The color of the shell is whitish, the revolving ribs in perfect specimens being a beautiful purple.
