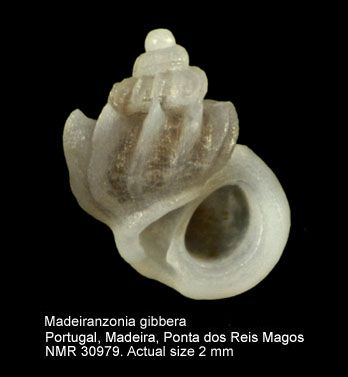

Scientific classification
- Kingdom: Animalia
- Phylum: Mollusca
- Class: Gastropoda
- Subclass: Caenogastropoda
- Order: Littorinimorpha
- Family: Rissoidae
- Genus: Madeiranzonia; Moolenbeek & Faber, 2007
- Species: M. gibbera

Binomial name
- Madeiranzonia gibbera (R. B. Watson, 1873)

Synonyms
- Manzonia gibbera (R. B. Watson, 1873); Rissoa gibbera R. B. Watson, 1873

= Madeiranzonia =

Species of gastropod

Madeiranzonia gibbera is a species of minute sea snail, a marine gastropod mollusc or micromollusc in the family Rissoidae. It is the only species in the genus Madeiranzonia.
