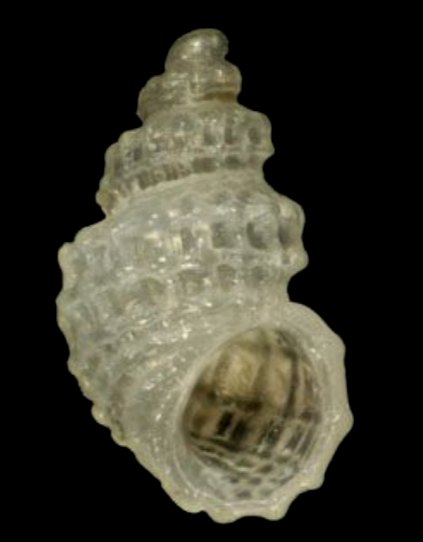
- Shell of Alvania weinkauffi weinkauffi (specimen at the Natural History Museum, Rotterdam)

Scientific classification
- Kingdom: Animalia
- Phylum: Mollusca
- Class: Gastropoda
- Subclass: Caenogastropoda
- Order: Littorinimorpha
- Superfamily: Rissooidea
- Family: Rissoidae
- Genus: Alvania
- Species: A. weinkauffi

Binomial name
- Alvania weinkauffi Weinkauff, 1868

Synonyms
- Alvinia weinkauffi (Weinkauff, 1868); Manzonia (Alvinia) weinkauffi (Schwartz von Mohrenstern, 1868)

= Alvania weinkauffi =

Species of gastropod

Alvania weinkauffi is a species of minute sea snail, a marine gastropod mollusk or micromollusk in the family Rissoidae.

Subspecies

- Alvania weinkauffi jacobusi Oliverio, Amati & Nofroni, 1986
- Alvania weinkauffi weinkauffi (Weinkauff, 1868)

== Description ==
The length of the shell varies between 2 mm and 4 mm.

The imperforate shell is thin, subpellucid and a little shining. It is whitish or yellowish. It has a clathrate sculpture by longitudinal riblets, and much stronger, distant spiral ridges. The shell contains six convex, angulated and shouldered whorls with a deeply incised suture. The aperture is smooth within and slightly varicose externally.

== Distribution ==
This species occurs in the Mediterranean Sea off Algeria, Tunisia and Sicily.
