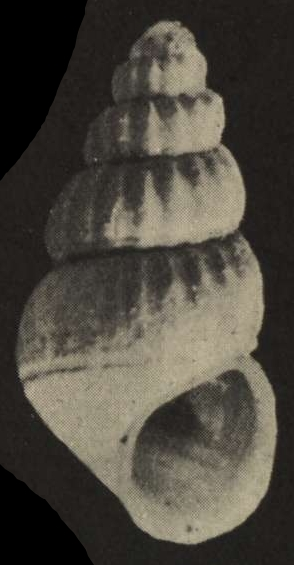
- Black-and-white photo of apertural view of the paratype of Alvinia gallinacea from Poor Knights Islands.

Scientific classification
- Kingdom: Animalia
- Phylum: Mollusca
- Class: Gastropoda
- Subclass: Caenogastropoda
- Order: Littorinimorpha
- Superfamily: Rissooidea
- Family: Rissoidae; Gray, 1847

Species
- See text

Synonyms
- Cingulinae Keen, 1971; Rissoinae Gray, 1847; Setiinae V. V. Anistratenko & Starobogatov, 1994 (junior subjective synonym)

= Rissoidae =

Family of gastropods

Rissoidae is a large family of sea snails. Members of the Rissoidae are very small in size and possess an operculum.

== Distribution and habitat ==
Rissoidae are found worldwide. They live on sandy or gravel bottoms among algae or marine plants. They are also found under rocks in crevices or other sheltered places.

== Subfamilies ==
The following subfamilies were recognized in the taxonomy of Bouchet & Rocroi of 2005:

- Rissoinae Gray, 1847
- Rissoininae Stimpson, 1865

In 2013 the subfamily Rissoininae was elevated to the rank of family Rissoinidae by Criscione F. & Ponder W.F.

== Genera ==
Genera within Rissoidae include:

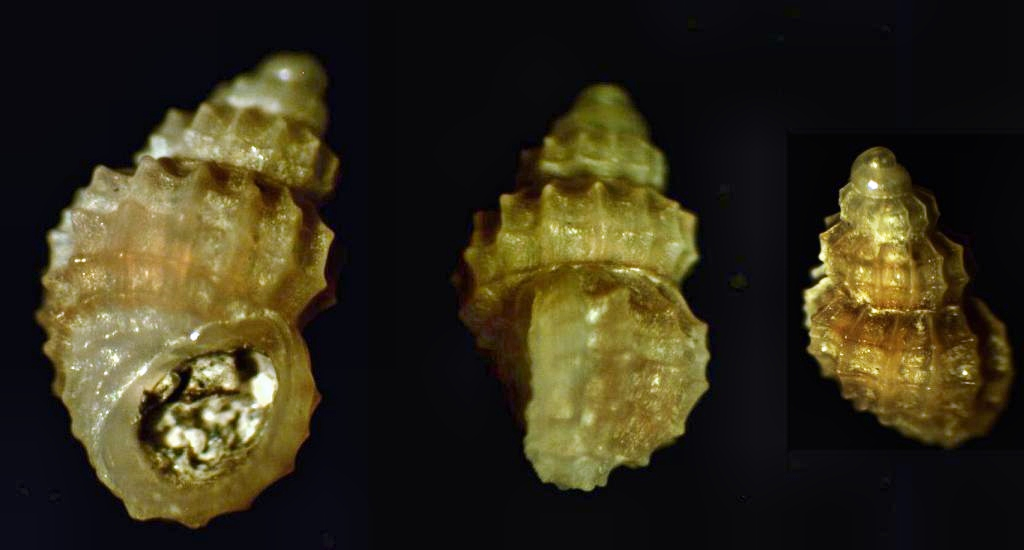
Alvania clathrella

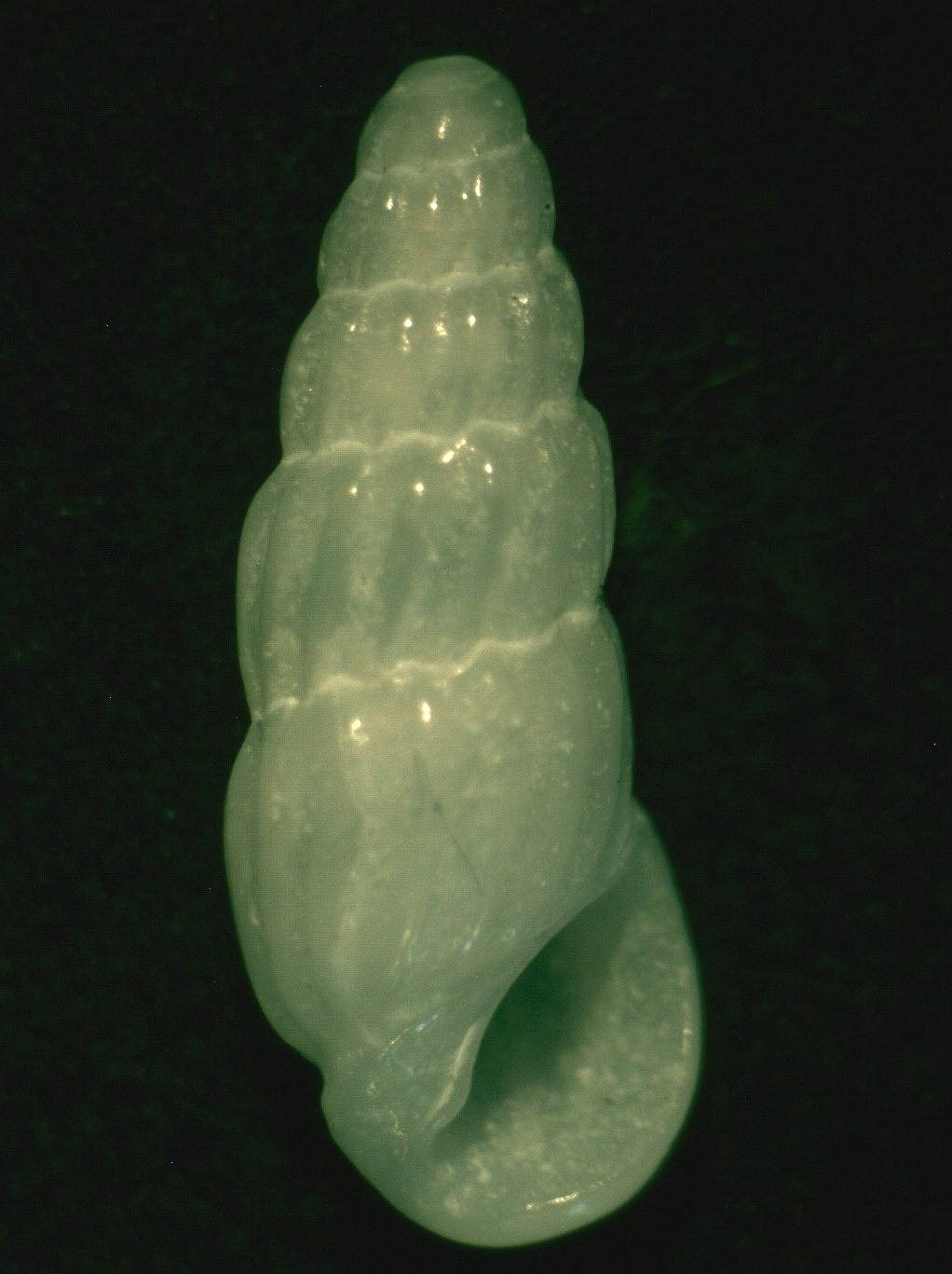
Rissoina crassa

- Alvania Risso, 1826
- Amphirissoa Dautzenberg & Fischer, 1897
- Archaschenia Zhgenti, 1981 †
- Benthonella Dall, 1889
- Benthonellania Lozouet, 1990
- Boreocingula Golikov and Kussakin, 1974
- Boreomica Guzhov, 2017 †
- Botryphallus Ponder, 1990
- Calvadosiella Wenz, 1939 †
- Cingula Fleming, 1828
- Crisilla Monterosato, 1917
- Ellenstrongia Amati, Di Giulio & Oliverio, 2023
- Frigidoalvania Waren, 1974
- Galeodinopsis Sacco, 1895
- Gofasia Bouchet & Warén, 1993
- Haurakia Iredale, 1915
- Hirsonella J. C. Fischer, 1969 †
- Ihungia Marwick, 1931 †
- Koskinakra Kadolsky, 2016 †
- Lucidestea Laseron, 1956
- Madeiranzonia Moolenbeek & Faber, 2007
- Manzonia Brusina, 1870
- Mohrensternia Stoliczka, 1868 †
- Obtusella Cossmann, 1921
- Omanimerelina Moolenbeek & Bosch, 2007
- Onoba H. Adams and A. Adams, 1852
- Paleoceratia Gründel, 1999 †
- Parashiela Laseron, 1956
- Peringiella Monterosato, 1878
- Plagyostila Folin, 1872
- Pontiturboella Sitnikova, Starobogatov, Anistratenko, 1992
- Porosalvania Gofas, 2007
- Powellisetia Ponder, 1965
- Pseudosetia Monterosato, 1884
- Punctulum Jeffreys, 1884
- Pusillina Monterosato, 1884
- Pyrgosformisia Barros, S. Lima & D. Tenório, 2018
- Quarkia Faber, 2009
- Rissoa Desmarest, 1814
- Setia H. and A. Adams, 1852
- Simulamerelina Ponder, 1985
- Striatestea Powell, 1927
- Subestea Cotton, 1944
- Subonoba Iredale, 1915
- Thierachella J. C. Fischer, 1969 †
- Trochoturbella Cossmann, 1921 †
- Vitricithra Laseron, 1956
- Voorwindia Ponder, 1985
- Zhgentia Iljina, 2006 †

Taxon inquirendum

- Flemingia Jeffreys, 1884
- † Paryphostoma Bayan, 1873
- Polyhyba Haas, 1947

Genera brought into synonymy

- Adolphinoba Powell, 1930: synonym of Attenuata Hedley, 1918
- Alvinia Monterosato, 1884: synonym of Alvania Risso, 1826
- Ameririssoa Ponder, 1985: synonym of Alvania Risso, 1826
- Apicularia Monterosato, 1884: synonym of Rissoa Desmarest, 1814
- Auriconoba Nordsieck, 1972: synonym of Rissoa Desmarest, 1814
- Flemellia Nordsieck, 1972: synonym of Alvania Risso, 1826
- Galeodina Monterosato, 1884: synonym of Alvania Risso, 1826
- Goniostoma Villa, 1841: synonym of Rissoa Desmarest, 1814
- Gueriniana Nordsieck, 1972: synonym of Rissoa Desmarest, 1814
- Haurakiopsis A. W. B. Powell, 1937: synonym of Haurakia Iredale, 1915
- Lamarckia Leach, 1852: synonym of Rissoa Desmarest, 1814
- Lilacinia Nordsieck, 1972: synonym of Rissoa Desmarest, 1814
- Linemera Finlay, 1924: synonym of Alvania Risso, 1826
- Loxostoma Bivona-Bernardi, 1838: synonym of Rissoa Desmarest, 1814
- Manawatawhia Powell, 1937: synonym of Onoba (Manawatawhia) Powell, 1937 represented as Onoba H. Adams & A. Adams, 1852
- Massotia Bucquoy, Dautzenberg & Dollfus, 1884: synonym of Alvania Risso, 1826
- Mereliniopsis Ponder, 1967: synonym of Merelina Iredale, 1915
- Moniziella Nordsieck, 1972: synonym of Alvania Risso, 1826
- Nobolira Finlay, 1926: synonym of Attenuata Hedley, 1918
- Ovirissoa Hedley, 1916: synonym of Onoba (Ovirissoa) Hedley, 1916 represented as Onoba H. Adams & A. Adams, 1852
- Parvisetia Monterosato, 1884: synonym of Setia H. Adams & A. Adams, 1852
- Persephona Leach, 1852: synonym of Rissoa Desmarest, 1814
- Plagiostyla Fischer, 1872: synonym of Plagyostila de Folin, 1872
- Promerelina Powell, 1926: synonym of Merelina Iredale, 1915
- Radiata Nordsieck, 1972: synonym of Pusillina Monterosato, 1884
- Rissoia Bronn, 1848: synonym of Rissoa Desmarest, 1814
- Rissostomia G. O. Sars, 1878: synonym of Rissoa Desmarest, 1814
- Rudolphosetia Monterosato, 1917: synonym of Setia H. Adams & A. Adams, 1852
- Sabanea Monterosato, 1884: synonym of Rissoa Desmarest, 1814
- Schwartzia Bucquoy, Dautzenberg & Dollfus, 1884: synonym of Rissoa Desmarest, 1814
- Sfaxiella Nordsieck, 1972: synonym of Rissoa Desmarest, 1814
- Turboella Leach, 1847: synonym of Rissoa Desmarest, 1814
- Turgidina Verduin, 1979: synonym of Pusillina Monterosato, 1884
- Zippora Leach, 1852: synonym of Rissoa Desmarest, 1814
