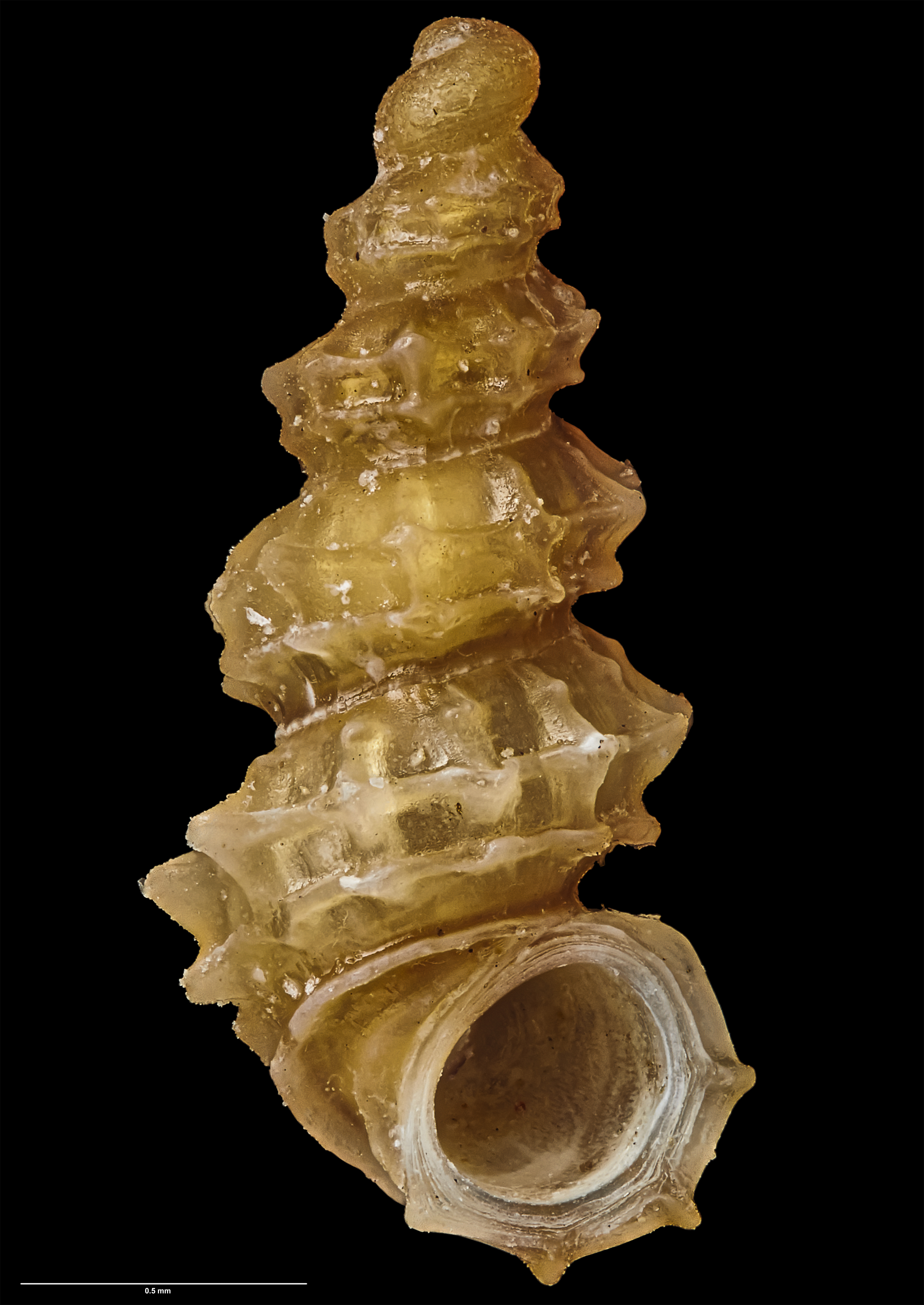
- Shell of Merelina lacunosa

Scientific classification
- Kingdom: Animalia
- Phylum: Mollusca
- Class: Gastropoda
- Subclass: Caenogastropoda
- Order: Littorinimorpha
- Family: Lironobidae
- Genus: Merelina; Iredale, 1915

Type species
- Merelina cheilostoma (Tenison Woods, 1877)

Synonyms
- Merelina (Mereliniopsis) Ponder, 1967; Merelina (Promerelina) A. W. B. Powell, 1926 ·; Mereliniopsis Ponder, 1967; Promerelina Powell, 1926

= Merelina =

Genus of gastropods

Merelina is a genus of minute sea snails, marine gastropod mollusks or micromollusks in the family Lironobidae.

== Species ==
Species within the genus Merelina include:

- † Merelina avita Marwick, 1928
- Merelina cancellata Criscione & Ponder, 2011
- Merelina cheilostoma (Tenison Woods, 1877)
- Merelina cochleata Powell, 1927
- Merelina compacta Powell, 1937
- Merelina coronata (Powell, 1926)
- Merelina crassissima Powell, 1937
- Merelina crispulata Powell, 1937
- Merelina crossaeformis (Powell, 1926)
- † Merelina effodita Laws, 1950
- Merelina elegans (Angas, 1877)
- Merelina foliata (Suter, 1908)
- Merelina gracilis (Angas, 1877)
- Merelina harrisonae Powell, 1939
- Merelina hirta Criscione & Ponder, 2011
- † Merelina kaawensis Laws, 1936
- Merelina lacunosa (Powell, 1926)
- Merelina lordhowensis Criscione & Ponder, 2011
- Merelina lyalliana (Suter, 1898)
- Merelina manawatawhia Powell, 1937
- Merelina maoriana Powell, 1939
- Merelina norfolkensis Criscione & Ponder, 2011
- Merelina pagodiformis (G.B. Sowerby III, 1914)
- Merelina pauereques Powell, 1937
- Merelina petronella (Melvill & Standen, 1901)
- Merelina pisinna (Melvill & Standen, 1896)
- Merelina plaga Finlay, 1926
- Merelina queenslandica Laseron, 1956
- Merelina rubiginosa Ponder, 1967
- † Merelina saginata Laws, 1939
- Merelina superba Powell, 1927
- Merelina taupoensis Powell, 1939
- † Merelina telkibana Ladd, 1966
- Merelina tricarinata Powell, 1937
- † Merelina waiotemarama Laws, 1948
- Merelina waitangiensis Powell, 1933

Species brought into synonymy

- Merelina corruga Laseron, 1956 : synonym of Manzonia corruga (Laseron, 1956)
- Merelina crassula Rehder, 1980 : synonym of Manzonia crassula (Rehder, 1980)
- Merelina cyrta Cotton, 1944 : synonym of Alvania hedleyi Thiele, 1930
- Merelina eminens Laseron, 1950 : synonym of Alvania fasciata (Tenison Woods, 1876)
- Merelina goliath Laseron, 1956 : synonym of Iravadia quadrasi (Boettger, 1893)
- Merelina granulosa (Pease, 1862) accepted as Manzonia granulosa (Pease, 1862)
- Merelina hewa Kay, 1979 : synonym of Manzonia hewa (Kay, 1979)
- Merelina hians Laseron, 1957 : synonym of Sansoniella minuta (Hornung & Mermod, 1927)
- Merelina humera Laseron, 1956 : synonym of Iravadia quadrasi (Boettger, 1893)
- Merelina longinqua Rehder, 1980 : synonym of Manzonia longinqua (Rehder, 1980)
- Merelina reversa Laseron, 1956 : synonym of Iravadia quadrasi (Boettger, 1893)
- Merelina sculptilis May, 1920 : synonym of Alvania sculptilis (May, 1920)
- Merelina solida Laseron, 1956 : synonym of Iravadia mahimensis (Melvill, 1893)
- Merelina subreticulata Laseron, 1950 : synonym of Alvania suprasculpta (May, 1915)
- Merelina sucina Laseron, 1956 a: synonym of Iravadia mahimensis (Melvill, 1893)
- Merelina tokyoensis (Pilsbry, 1904) : synonym of Manzonia tokyoensis (Pilsbry, 1904)
- Merelina wanawana Kay, 1979 : synonym of Manzonia wanawana (Kay, 1979)
