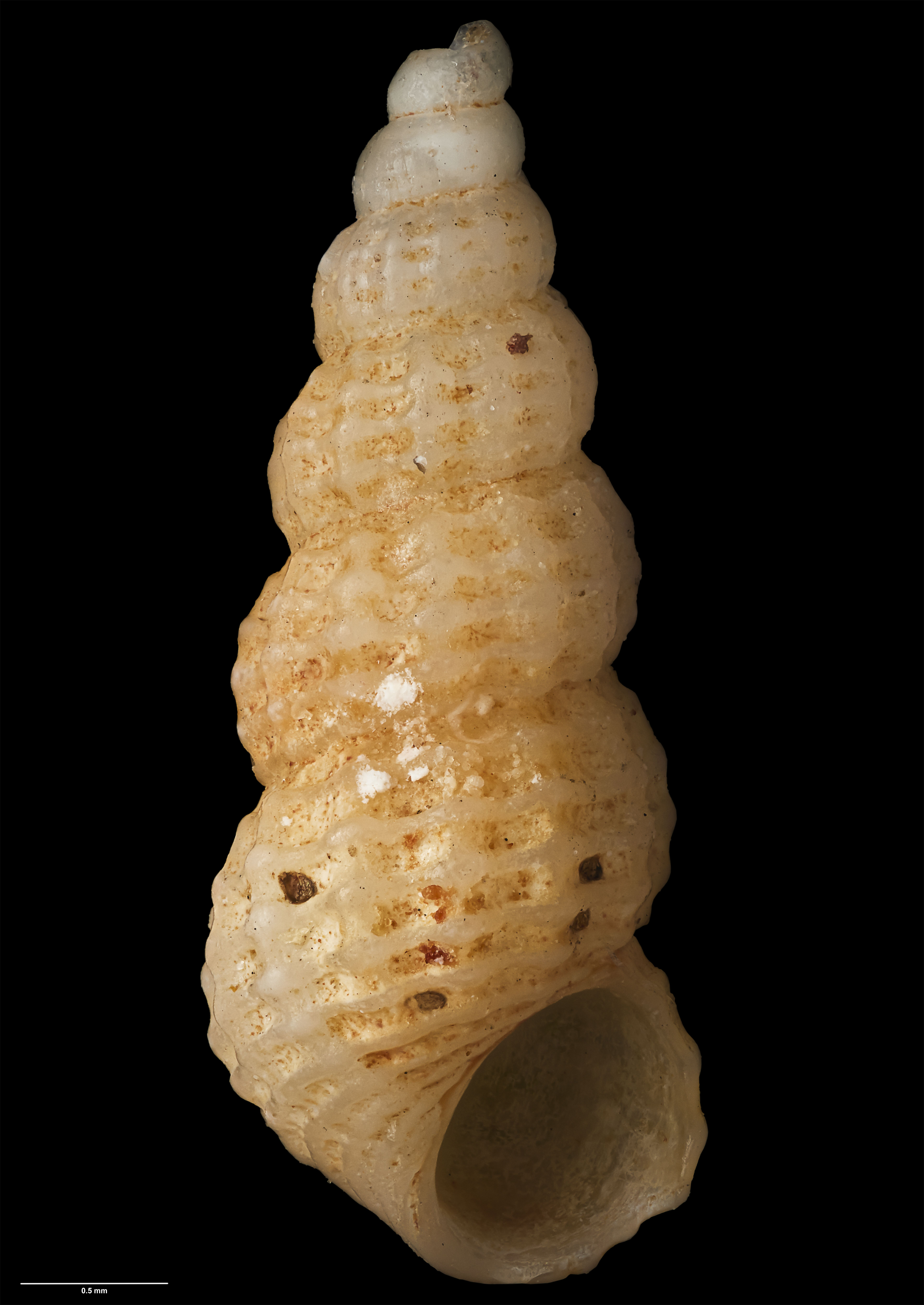
- Holotype from the Auckland War Memorial Museum

Scientific classification
- Kingdom: Animalia
- Phylum: Mollusca
- Class: Gastropoda
- Subclass: Caenogastropoda
- Order: Littorinimorpha
- Superfamily: Rissooidea
- Family: Lironobidae
- Genus: Merelina
- Species: M. waitangiensis

Binomial name
- Merelina waitangiensis A. W. B. Powell, 1933

= Merelina waitangiensis =

Species of sea snail

Merelina waitangiensis is a species of sea snail, a marine gastropod mollusc in the family Lironobidae. It is endemic to the waters surrounding the Chatham Islands of New Zealand.

== Description ==
In the original description, Powell described the species as follows:

Shell nearest to superba Powell 1927, but differing from that species in having more numerous spiral ridges and fewer axials, which causes the enclosed rectangular interspaces to be more than twice as long as high. Penultimate whorl with thirteen axials. Spire whorls with four to five spirals, body-whorl with nine. In superba there are from three to five spiral ridges on spire whorls and eight on the body-whorl. Post-nuclear whorls 5, protoconch damaged. Spire tall, more than three times height of aperture. Colour uniformly buff.

The shells of the species measure 4.4 mm (0.17 in) in height and 1.7 mm (0.067 in) in diameter. It is the largest known species of Merelina found in New Zealand, identifiable by its 4-5 spirals on spire whorls, by having wider than high clathrate interspaces, and due to its uniformly buff colour.

== Taxonomy ==
The species was first described by A. W. B. Powell in 1933. The holotype was collected by Powell himself in February 1933, from shell sand at Waitangi in the Chatham Islands, and is held by the Auckland War Memorial Museum.

== Distribution and habitat ==
M. waitangiensis is endemic to New Zealand, found in the waters of the Chatham Islands. As of 2026, only two specimens have been recorded, the holotype and a specimen collected by dredging off the coast of Waitangi in 1995, at a depth of 40 m (130 ft).
