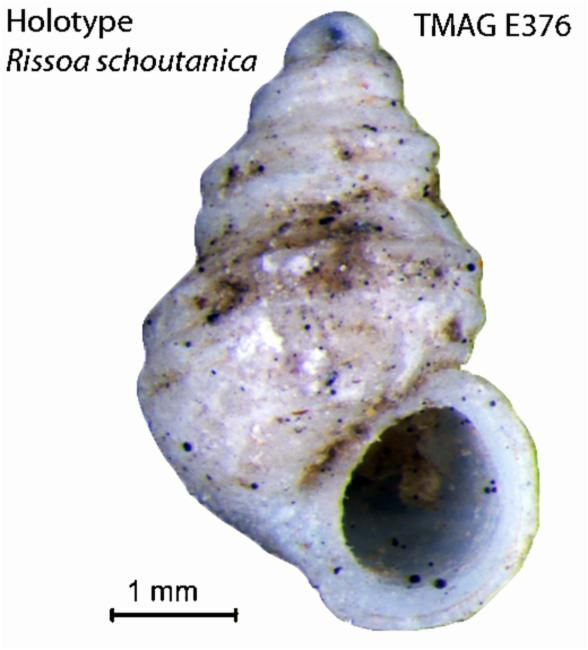
- Attenuata schoutanica

Scientific classification
- Kingdom: Animalia
- Phylum: Mollusca
- Class: Gastropoda
- Subclass: Caenogastropoda
- Order: Littorinimorpha
- Family: Lironobidae
- Genus: Attenuata; Hedley, 1918

Type species
- Rissoa integella Hedley, 1904

Synonyms
- Adolphinoba Powell, 1930; Nobolira Finlay, 1926

= Attenuata =

Genus of gastropods

Attenuata is a genus of minute sea snails, marine gastropod mollusks or micromollusks in the family Lironobidae.

== Species ==
There are 21 species within the genus Attenuata, including:

- † Attenuata admiranda Richardson, 1997
- Attenuata affinis (Powell, 1940)
- Attenuata archensis (May, 1913)
- Attenuata bollonsi (Powell, 1930)
- † Attenuata charassa (Finlay, 1924)
- Attenuata cochlearella (Powell, 1937)
- Attenuata contigua (Powell, 1940)
- † Attenuata eocenica Maxwell, 1992
- Attenuata finlayi (Powell, 1930)
- Attenuata hinemoa (C. A. Fleming, 1948)
- † Attenuata inflata (Laws, 1939)
- Attenuata integella (Hedley, 1904)
- Attenuata lockyeri (Hedley, 1911)
- Attenuata manawatawhia (Powell, 1937)
- Attenuata merelina (Dell, 1956)
- Attenuata orientalis (Dell, 1956)
- † Attenuata polyvincta (Finlay, 1924)
- Attenuata praetornatilis (Hedley, 1912)
- Attenuata regis (Powell, 1940)
- Attenuata schoutanica (May, 1913)
- Attenuata wilsonensis (Gatliff & Gabriel, 1913)

== Distribution ==
This marine genus is endemic to Australia and is found off New South Wales, Queensland, South Australia, Tasmania and Victoria.
