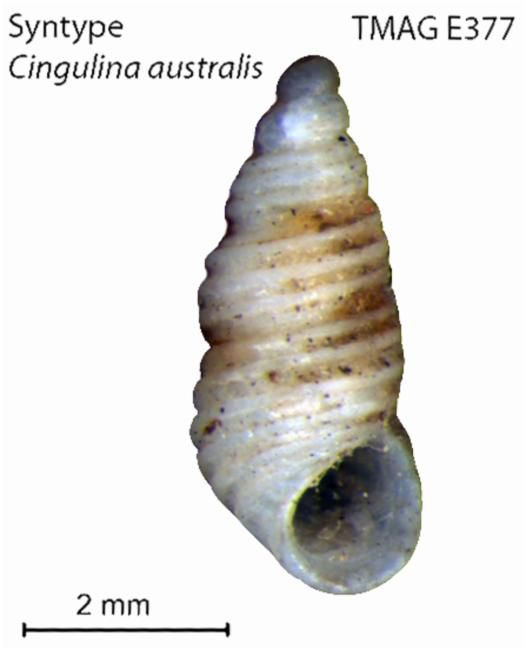
- Lironoba australis

Scientific classification
- Kingdom: Animalia
- Phylum: Mollusca
- Class: Gastropoda
- Subclass: Caenogastropoda
- Order: Littorinimorpha
- Family: Lironobidae
- Genus: Lironoba; Iredale, 1915

Type species
- Lironoba suteri (Hedley, 1904)

= Lironoba =

Genus of gastropods

Lironoba is a genus of minute sea snails, marine gastropod mollusks or micromollusks in the family Lironobidae.

== Species ==
There are 9 species within the genus Lironoba including:

- Lironoba anomala Powell, 1940
- Lironoba australis (Tenison Woods, 1877)
- Lironoba elegans E. C. Smith, 1962
- Lironoba imbrex (Hedley, 1908)
- Lironoba matai Dell, 1952
- Lironoba rara (Thiele, 1925)
- Lironoba sulcata Cotton, 1944
- Lironoba suteri (Hedley, 1904)
- Lironoba unilirata (Tenison Woods, 1878)

Species brought into synonymy

- † Lironoba charassa Finlay, 1924: synonym of † Attenuata charassa (Finlay, 1924)
- Lironoba hebes Laseron, 1950: synonym of Onoba hebes (Laseron, 1950) (Basionym)
- † Lironoba polyvincta Finlay, 1924 †: synonym of † Attenuata polyvincta (Finlay, 1924)
