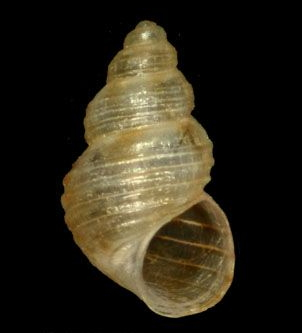
- Shell of Alvania sculptilis (specimen at the Natural History Museum, Rotterdam)

Scientific classification
- Kingdom: Animalia
- Phylum: Mollusca
- Class: Gastropoda
- Subclass: Caenogastropoda
- Order: Littorinimorpha
- Superfamily: Rissooidea
- Family: Rissoidae
- Genus: Alvania
- Species: A. sculptilis

Binomial name
- Alvania sculptilis (Monterosato, 1877)

Synonyms
- Rissoa (Alvinia) conspicua Pallary, 1900; Rissoa sculptilis Monterosato, 1877 (basionym); Rissoia sculptilis (Monterosato, 1877)

= Alvania sculptilis =

Species of gastropod

Alvania sculptilis is a species of small sea snail, a marine gastropod mollusk or micromollusk in the family Rissoidae.

== Taxonomy ==
There is also the Australian marine species Alvania sculptilis (May, 1920) (synonym and basionym: Merelina sculptilis May, 1920 ), a junior secondary homonym of Alvania sculptilis (Monterosato, 1877). However, the genus Alvania as currently used has a very broad taxonomic extension, and these two species may very well end up in different genera when a robust phylogeny becomes available. For the time being, it is thus advisable to keep using the invalid name Alvania sculptilis (May, 1920) for the Australian species.

== Description ==
The length of the shell attains 2 mm.

The shell is a little shouldered. It is smooth, yellowish, with dark colored punctate dots in spiral series, about six series on the body whorl. The lip is a little thickened.

== Distribution ==
This rare species occurs in European waters (the Mediterranean Sea off Algiers and Greece)
