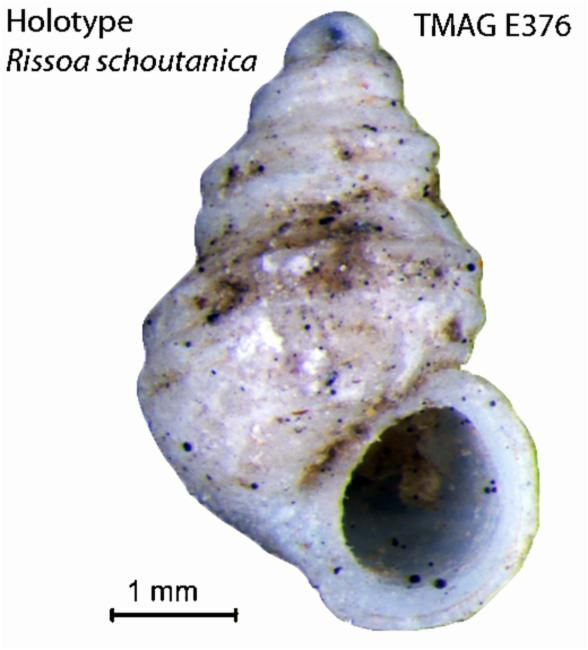
- Attenuata schoutanica

Scientific classification
- Kingdom: Animalia
- Phylum: Mollusca
- Class: Gastropoda
- Subclass: Caenogastropoda
- Order: Littorinimorpha
- Superfamily: Rissooidea
- Family: Lironobidae; Ponder, 1967

= Lironobidae =

Family of sea snails

Lironobidae is a family of gastropods belonging to the order Littorinimorpha.

Genera:

- Attenuata Hedley, 1918
- Lironoba Iredale, 1915
- Merelina Iredale, 1915
