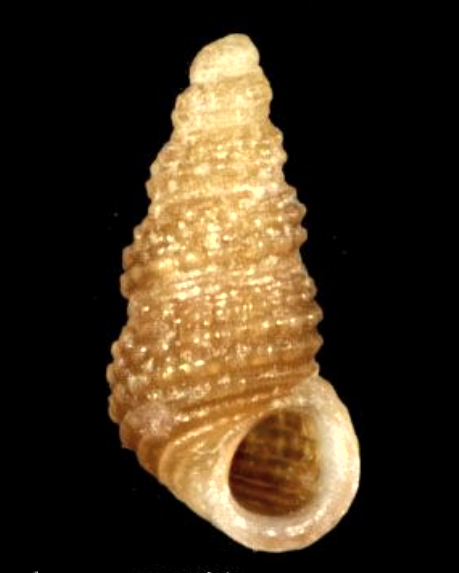
- Shell of Alvania suprasculpta (specimen at the Natural History Museum, Rotterdam)

Scientific classification
- Kingdom: Animalia
- Phylum: Mollusca
- Class: Gastropoda
- Subclass: Caenogastropoda
- Order: Littorinimorpha
- Superfamily: Rissooidea
- Family: Rissoidae
- Genus: Alvania
- Species: A. suprasculpta

Binomial name
- Alvania suprasculpta May, 1915

Synonyms
- Alvania (Linemera) suprasculpta May, 1915 · unaccepted; Merelina subreticulata Laseron, 1950 ·

= Alvania suprasculpta =

Species of gastropod

Alvania suprasculpta is a species of small sea snail, a marine gastropod mollusk or micromollusk in the family Rissoidae.

== Description ==
The length of the shell attains 2.3 mm, its diameter 1.1 mm.

(Original description) The elongate shell is white or yellowish. It contains 5½ rounded whorls. The suture is well impressed. The protoconch consists of 1½ smooth whorls. The teleoconch comprises four whorls. The spire whorls bear three spiral keels, about equally spaced. They are crossed by numerous axials of about equal size and distance, forming square meshes, which latter are finely spirally lirate. Small nodules are formed by the junction of the keels. On the base of the body whorl there are three extra keels. The aperture is rounded. The outer lip is thickened and scalloped by the keels.

== Distribution ==
This marine species is endemic to Australia and occurs off New South Wales, Queensland, South Australia, Tasmania and Victoria.
