= Alvania hedleyi =

Scientific classification
- Kingdom: Animalia
- Phylum: Mollusca
- Class: Gastropoda
- Subclass: Caenogastropoda
- Order: Littorinimorpha
- Superfamily: Rissooidea
- Family: Rissoidae
- Genus: Alvania
- Species: A. hedleyi

Binomial name
- Alvania hedleyi Thiele, 1930

Synonyms
- Alvania (Alvania) hedleyi Thiele, 1930; Merelina cyrta Cotton, 1944

Species of sea snail

Alvania hedleyi is a species of small sea snail, a marine gastropod mollusk or micromollusk in the family Rissoidae.

== Description ==
The length of the shell attains 2.5 mm, its diameter 1.3 mm.

== Distribution ==
This marine species is endemic to Australia and occurs off Western Australia.
