= Alvania fasciata =

Scientific classification
- Kingdom: Animalia
- Phylum: Mollusca
- Class: Gastropoda
- Subclass: Caenogastropoda
- Order: Littorinimorpha
- Superfamily: Rissooidea
- Family: Rissoidae
- Genus: Alvania
- Species: A. fasciata

Binomial name
- Alvania fasciata (Tenison Woods, 1876)

Synonyms
- Dunkeria fasciata Tenison Woods, 1876 (original combination); Merelina eminens Laseron, 1950; Rissoa hulliana Tate, 1899; Rissoa hullii Tate, 1893 (unnecessary replacement name for Dunkeria fasciata Tenison Woods, 1876, by Tate treated as a secondary homonym of Rissoa fasciata Requien, 1848); Rissoa hulliana eucraspeda Hedley, C. 1911

Species of gastropod

Alvania fasciata is a species of small sea snail, a marine gastropod mollusk or micromollusk in the family Rissoidae.

== Description ==
The length of the shell varies between 3.5 mm and 4 mm, its diameter is 2 mm.

(Original description) The minute shell is turretted, latticed all over. It is translucent and touched with pale yellow. It contains six convex whorls, bicarinate and beautifully cancellate, with a few elevated, shining, spiral and transverse lirae. The outer lip is simple. The columel!a is arcuate.

== Distribution ==
This marine species is endemic to Australia and occurs off New South Wales, South Australia, Tasmania and Victoria.
