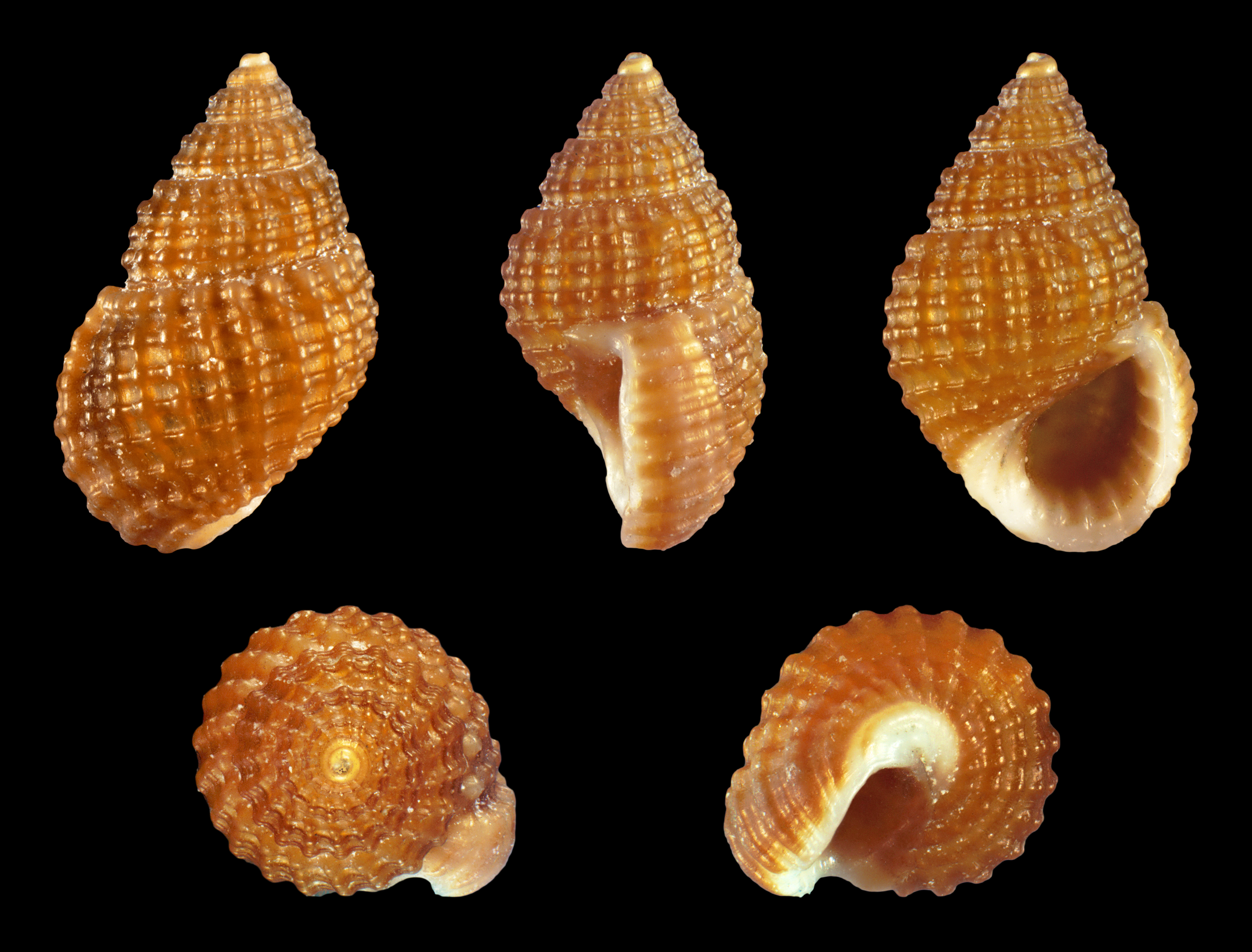

Scientific classification
- Kingdom: Animalia
- Phylum: Mollusca
- Class: Gastropoda
- Subclass: Caenogastropoda
- Order: Littorinimorpha
- Superfamily: Rissooidea
- Family: Rissoidae
- Genus: Alvania
- Species: A. cimex

Binomial name
- Alvania cimex (Linnaeus, 1758)

Synonyms
- Alvania cimicina Locard, 1886 (unjustified emendation); Alvania europea Risso, 1826; Alvania freminvillea Risso, 1826 ·; Alvania pyramidata Risso, 1826; Alvania (Turbona) cimex (Linnaeus, 1758); Rissoa calathicus auctt. (incorrect subsequent spelling); Rissoa calathiscus (Montagu, 1808); Rissoa cancellata Desmarest, 1814 nomen dubium; Rissoa cimex (Linnaeus, 1758); Rissoa granulata R. A. Philippi, 1836; Turbo calathiscus Montagu, 1808 (dubious synonym); Turbo cimex Linnaeus, 1758

= Alvania cimex =

Species of gastropod

Alvania cimex is a species of small sea snail, a marine gastropod mollusk or micromollusk in the family Rissoidae.

== Description ==
The length of the shell varies between 4 mm and 7 mm.

Alvania cimex and Alvania mamillata may be the same species, according to studies of Oliver et al. (2015), differing only in the larval life span. They share in the phylogram the same 16S and 28S sequences.

The imperforate shell is strong and opaque. It is covered by rounded granules in longitudinal and spiral series. It is white or light fulvous to chestnut color, unicolored or bifasciate. The outer lip is thick, labiate and suleate within, white-varicose externally.

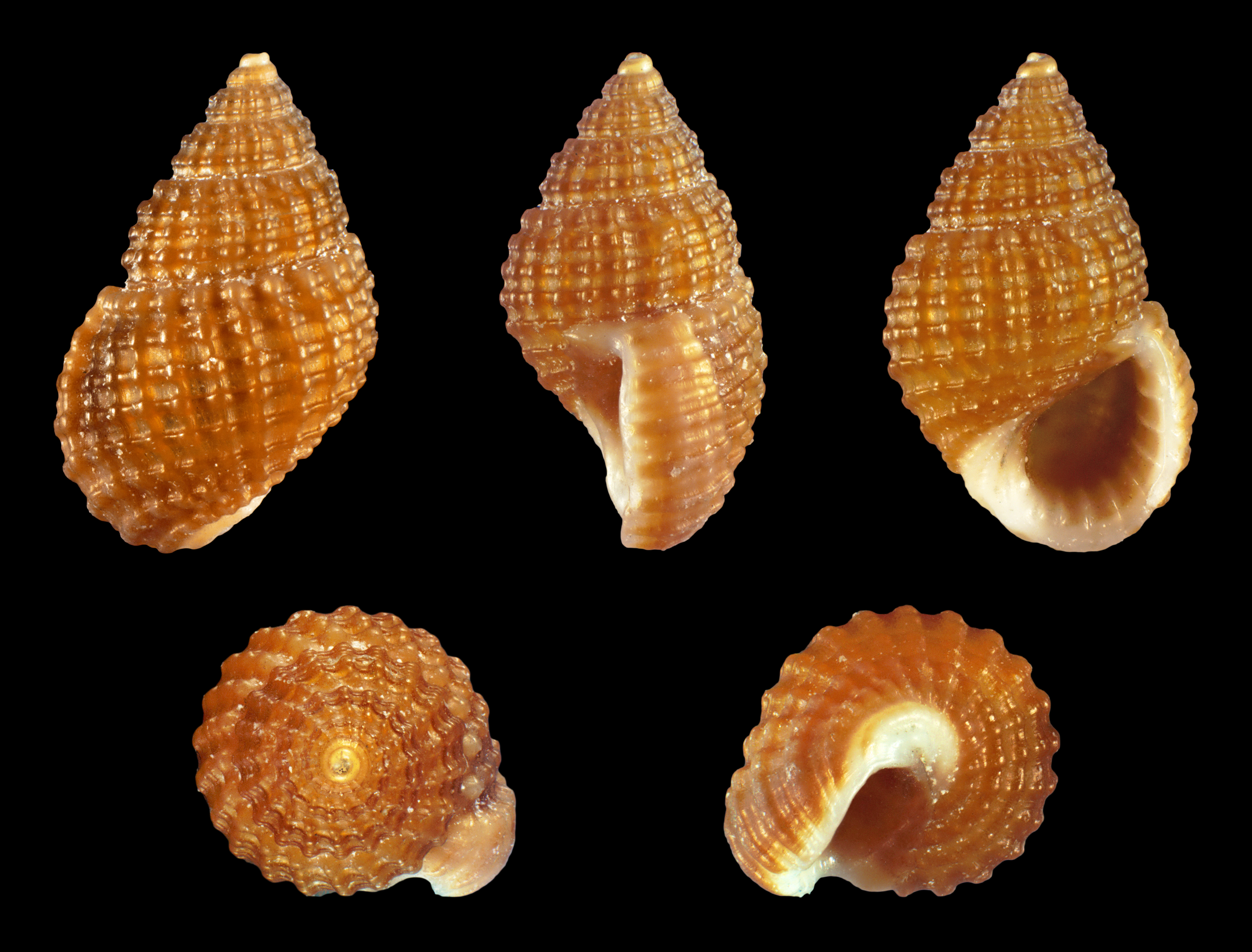
Alvania cimex f. fusca

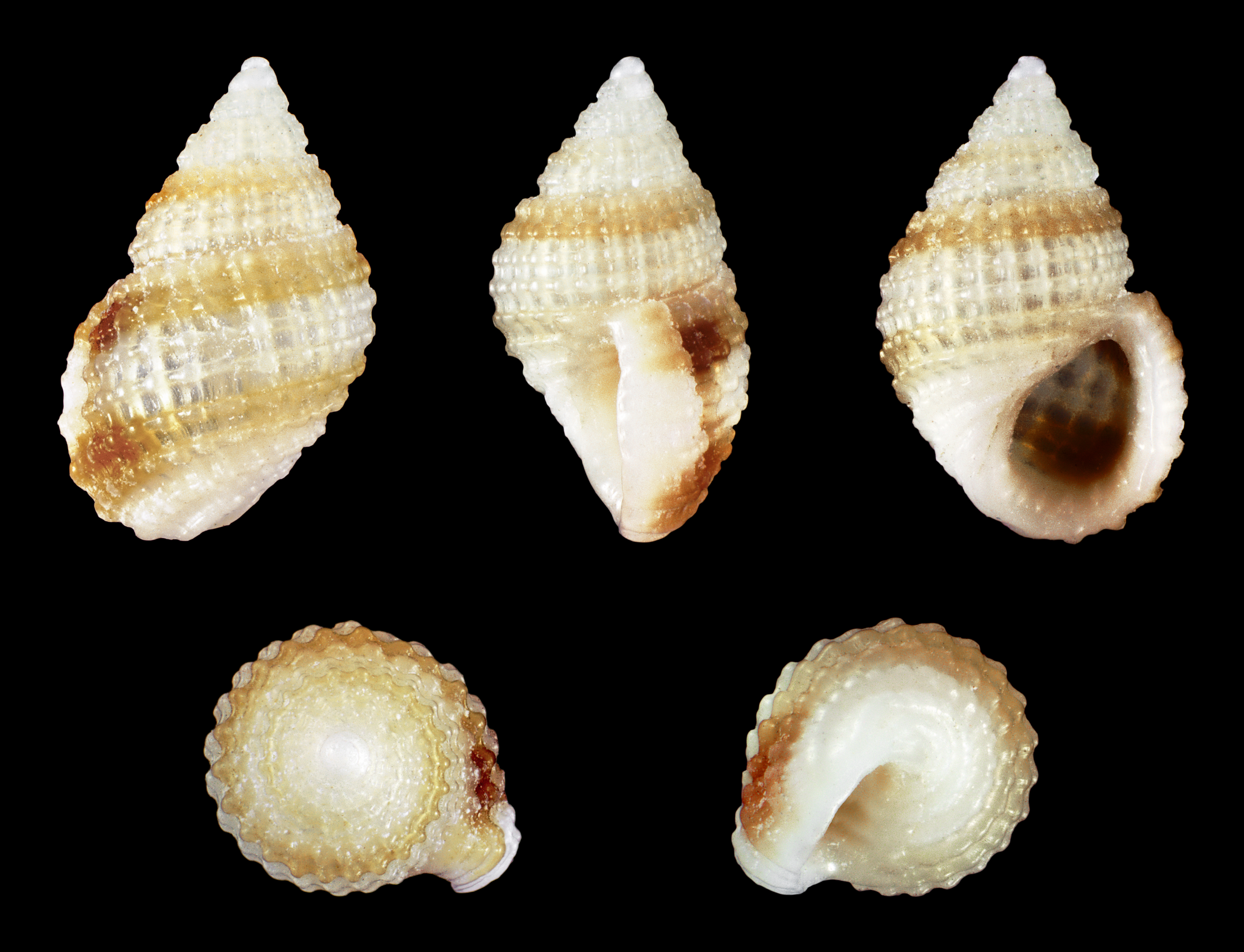
Alvania cimex f. fasciata

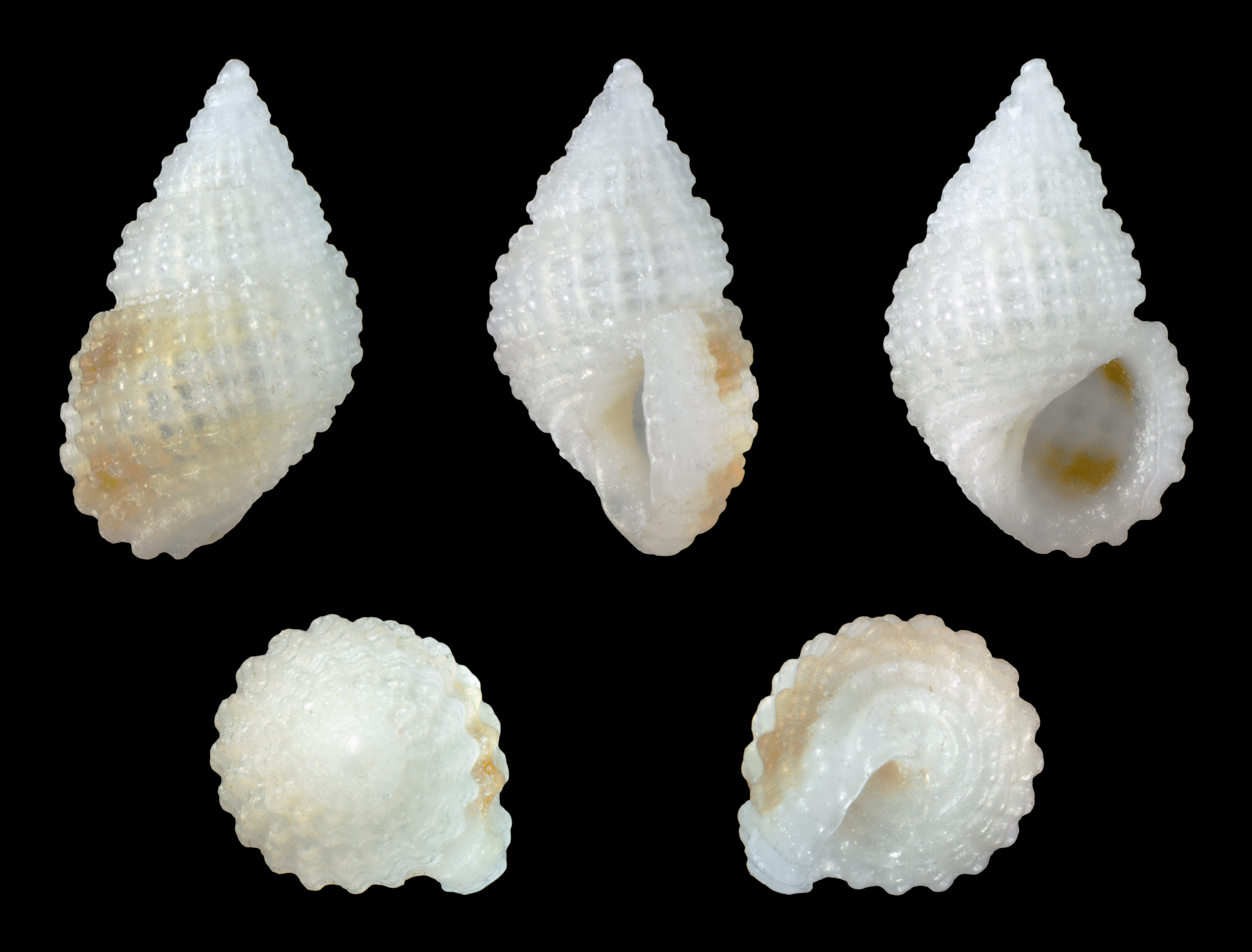
Alvania cimex f. lactea

== Distribution ==
This species occurs in the Northeast Atlantic Ocean, Mediterranean Sea and in the Black Sea.

Fossils were found in Pleistocene strata near Palermo, Sicily and near Monastir, Tunisia.
