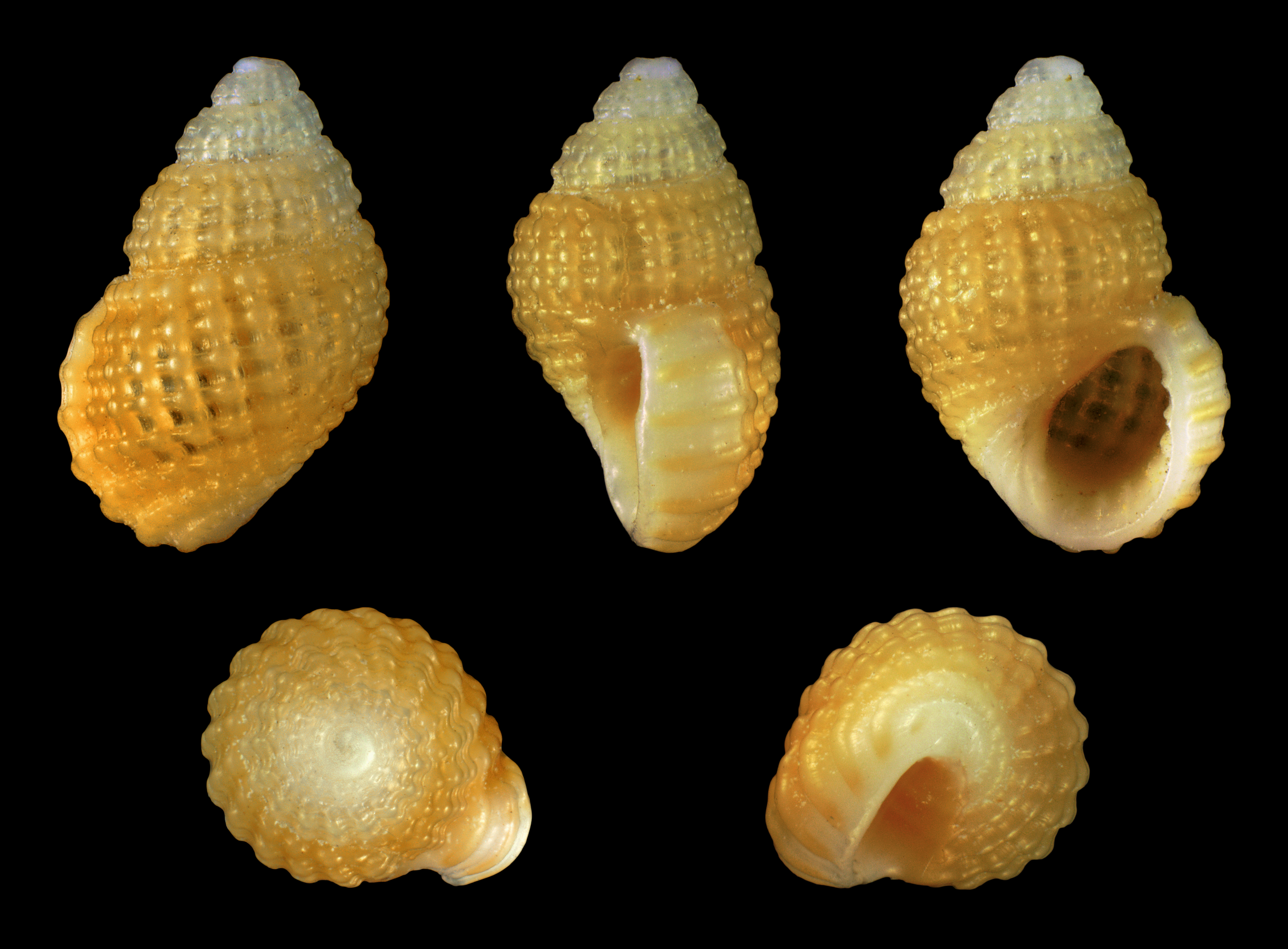

Scientific classification
- Kingdom: Animalia
- Phylum: Mollusca
- Class: Gastropoda
- Subclass: Caenogastropoda
- Order: Littorinimorpha
- Family: Rissoidae
- Genus: Alvania
- Species: A. mamillata

Binomial name
- Alvania mamillata Risso, 1826

Synonyms
- Alvania cingulata (Philippi, 1836); Rissoa cimex var. depauperata Monterosato, 1877 (dubious syn.); Rissoa cingulata Philippi, 1836

= Alvania mamillata =

Species of gastropod

Alvania mamillata is a species of small sea snail, a marine gastropod mollusk or micromollusk in the family Rissoidae.

== Description ==
The length of the shell attains 4.8 mm.

The imperforate shell is strong and opaque. It is covered by rounded granules in longitudinal and spiral series. It has a white or light fulvous to chestnut color, unicolored or bifasciate. The lip is thick, labiate and sulcate within, white-varicose externally.

== Distribution ==
This species occurs in the Mediterranean Sea (Malta, Greece, Turkey)
