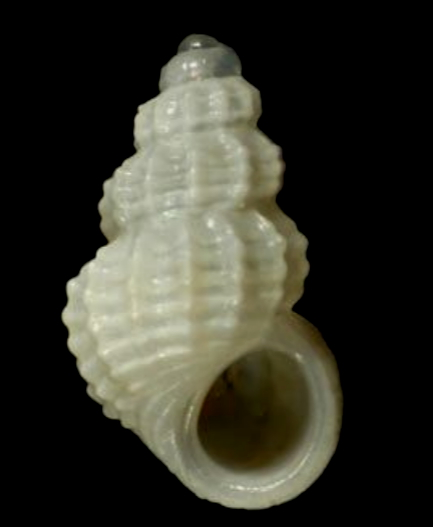
- Shell of Alvania macandrewi (specimen at the Natural History Museum, Rotterdam)

Scientific classification
- Kingdom: Animalia
- Phylum: Mollusca
- Class: Gastropoda
- Subclass: Caenogastropoda
- Order: Littorinimorpha
- Family: Rissoidae
- Genus: Alvania
- Species: A. macandrewi

Binomial name
- Alvania macandrewi (Manzoni, 1868)

Synonyms
- Rissoa macandrewi Manzoni, 1868 · unaccepted (original combination); Rissoa macandrewi var. spreta R. B. Watson, 1873: synonym of Alvania macandrewi (Manzoni, 1868)

= Alvania macandrewi =

Species of gastropod

Alvania macandrewi is a species of small sea snail, a marine gastropod mollusk or micromollusk in the family Rissoidae.

== Description ==
The length of the shell varies between 2.4 mm and 3 mm.

In some of its forms A. macandrewi greatly resembles some forms of Alvania canariensis. But the spire rises more in steps, the last three whorls are less attenuated, the ribs are wider-set, are broader, and fewer. The spiral scratchings are much more distinct. The heavy white labial rib and the absence of the brown stain either on this rib or on the tip of the apex are very distinctive.

The shell is imperforate, solid and has a yellowish chestnut color. It contains six whorls, turreted or round-shouldered, with close, large, longitudinal ribs, rendered nodulous by spiral impressed lines. The lip is duplicate, the outer lip expanded, with fimbriated edge.

== Distribution ==
This species occurs in the Atlantic Ocean off Madeira and the Canary Islands.
