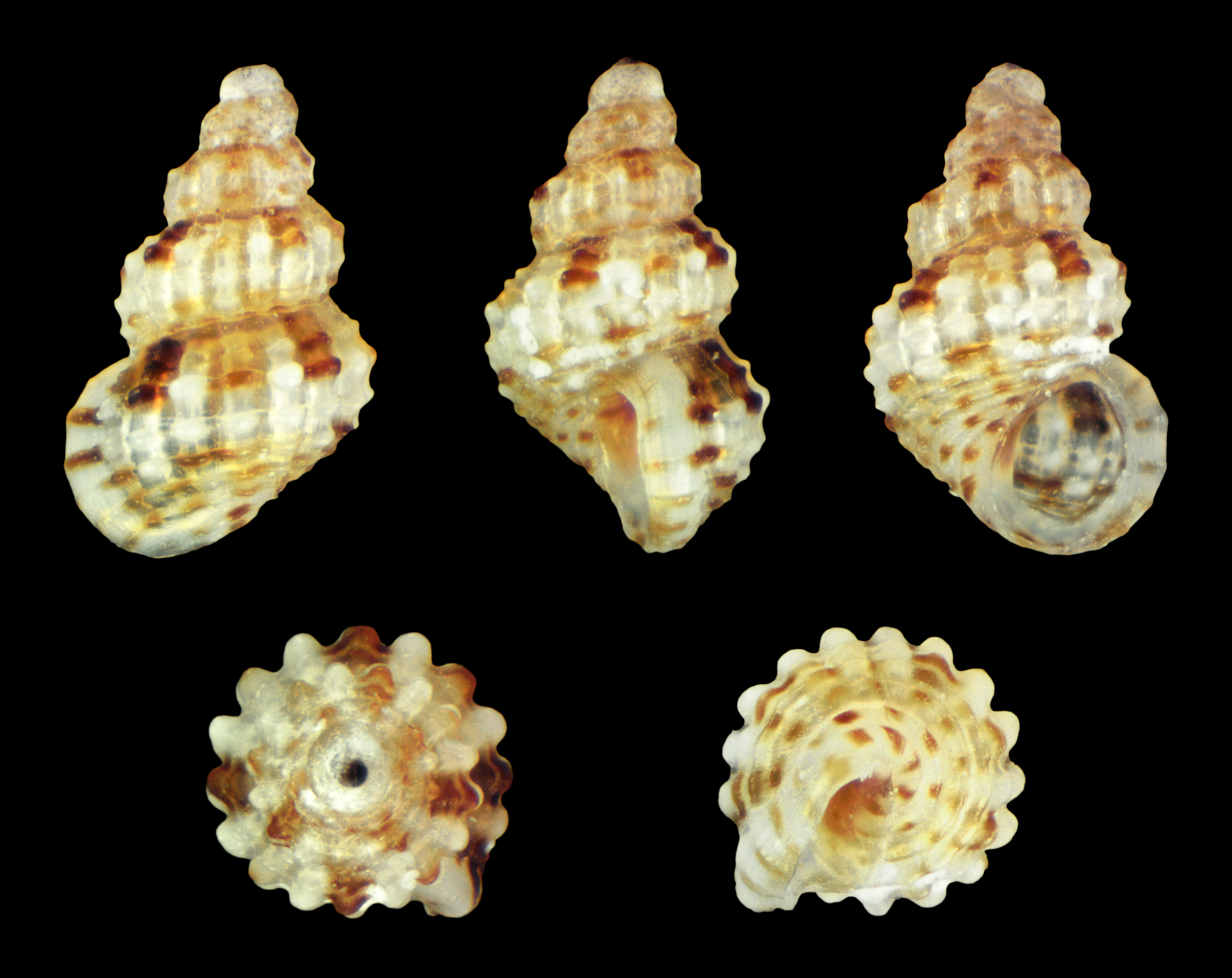

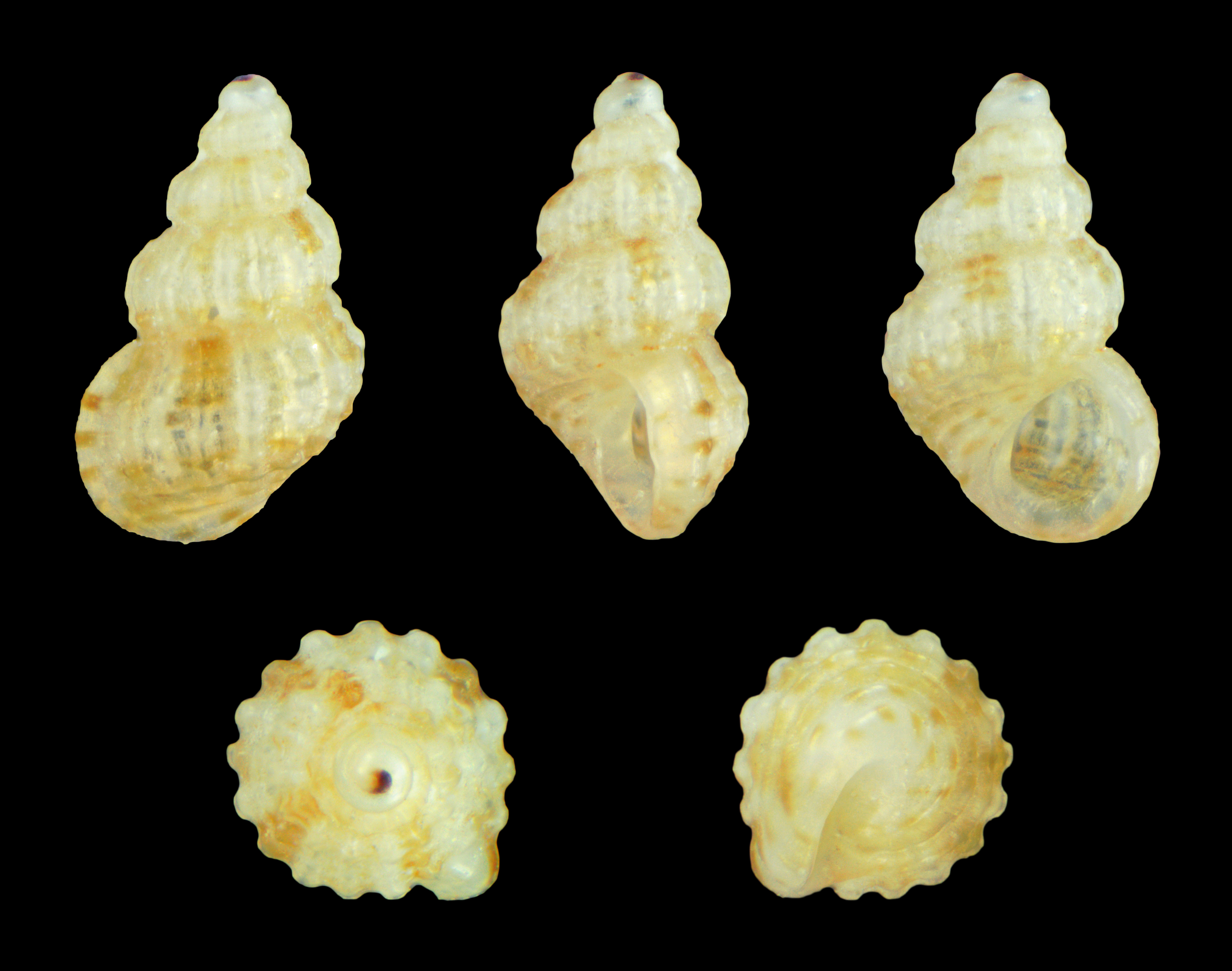

Scientific classification
- Kingdom: Animalia
- Phylum: Mollusca
- Class: Gastropoda
- Subclass: Caenogastropoda
- Order: Littorinimorpha
- Superfamily: Rissooidea
- Family: Rissoidae
- Genus: Alvania
- Species: A. canariensis

Binomial name
- Alvania canariensis (d'Orbigny, 1840)

Synonyms
- Rissoa canariensis d'Orbigny, 1840 (original combination)

= Alvania canariensis =

Species of gastropod

Alvania canariensis is a species of minute sea snail, a marine gastropod or micromollusk in the family Rissoidae.

== Description ==
The length of the shell varies between 1 mm and 3 mm.

The imperforate, white shell is solid. It is covered with rounded nodules by the intersection of longitudinal and spiral ribs. The shell contains five whorls, slightly convex, with a rather deep suture. The outer lip is thickened and margined.

About 3 1/2 of the whorls are in the teleoconch, while the other 1 1/2 are in the protoconch.

The protoconch is white, with a black or brown spot at the apex. The teleoconch is usually brown.

== Distribution ==
The species has been found off the Canary Islands.
