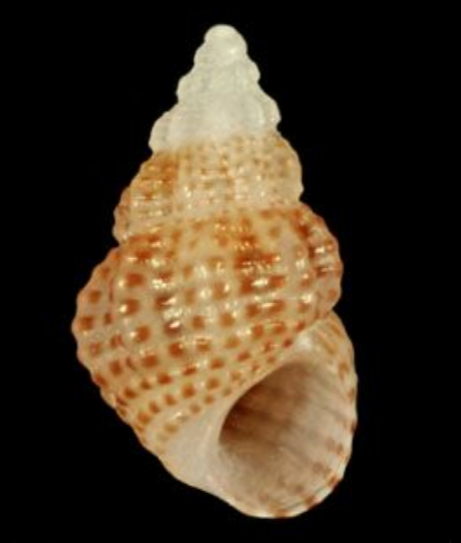
- Shell of Alvania aspera (specimen at the Natural History Museum, Rotterdam)

Scientific classification
- Kingdom: Animalia
- Phylum: Mollusca
- Class: Gastropoda
- Subclass: Caenogastropoda
- Order: Littorinimorpha
- Superfamily: Rissooidea
- Family: Rissoidae
- Genus: Alvania
- Species: A. aspera

Binomial name
- Alvania aspera (Philippi, 1844)

Synonyms
- Rissoa aspera R. A. Philippi, 1844 superseded combination

= Alvania aspera =

Species of gastropod

Alvania aspera is a species of minute sea snail, a marine gastropod mollusc or micromollusk in the family Rissoidae.

== Description ==
The length of the shell varies between 1.5 mm and 3.7 mm.

The shell resembles Alvania lineata, but the decussations are deeper, giving the nodules a rough appearance.

== Distribution ==
This species occurs in the Mediterranean Sea off Tunisia and Greece.
