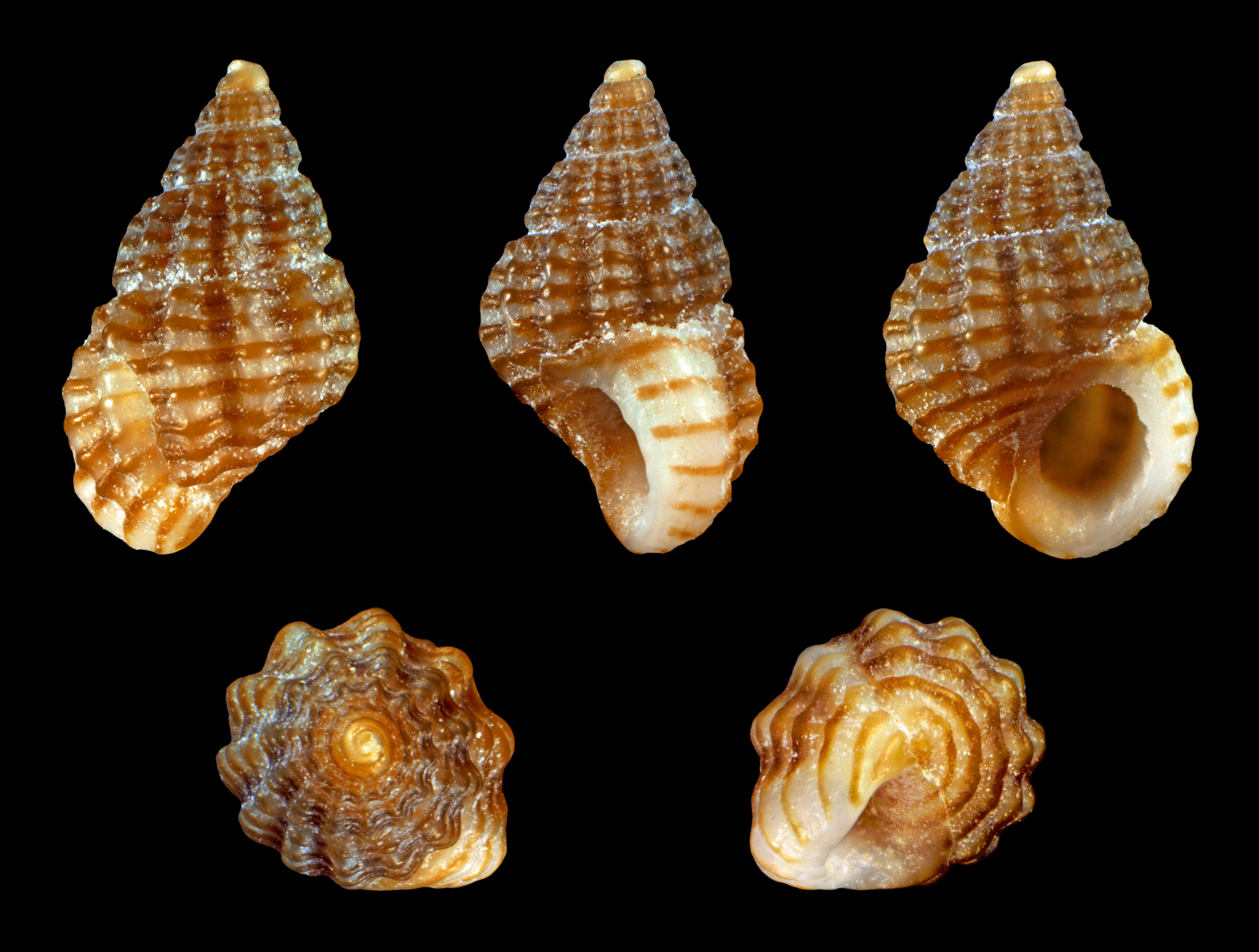
- A shell of Alvania lineata

Scientific classification
- Kingdom: Animalia
- Phylum: Mollusca
- Class: Gastropoda
- Subclass: Caenogastropoda
- Order: Littorinimorpha
- Superfamily: Rissooidea
- Family: Rissoidae
- Genus: Alvania
- Species: A. lineata

Binomial name
- Alvania lineata Risso, 1826

Synonyms
- Alvania capuleti Oberling, 1970; Alvania costulosa Risso, 1826; Alvania nodulosa Risso, 1826

= Alvania lineata =

Species of gastropod

Alvania lineata is a species of small sea snail, a marine gastropod mollusk or micromollusk in the family Rissoidae.

== Description ==
The length of the shell attains 5 mm.

The shell has strong ribs, becoming obsolete on the base, and numerous spiral lirae, yellowish or fulvous, the lirae forming lines of deeper color. The shell contains six convex whorls with a deep suture. The outer lip is thickened externally, plicate within.

== Distribution ==
This species occurs in the Mediterranean Sea off the Balearic Islands, Corsica, Greece and Turkey.

Fossils have been found in Pleistocene strata near Messina, Sicily and near Monastir, Tunisia.
