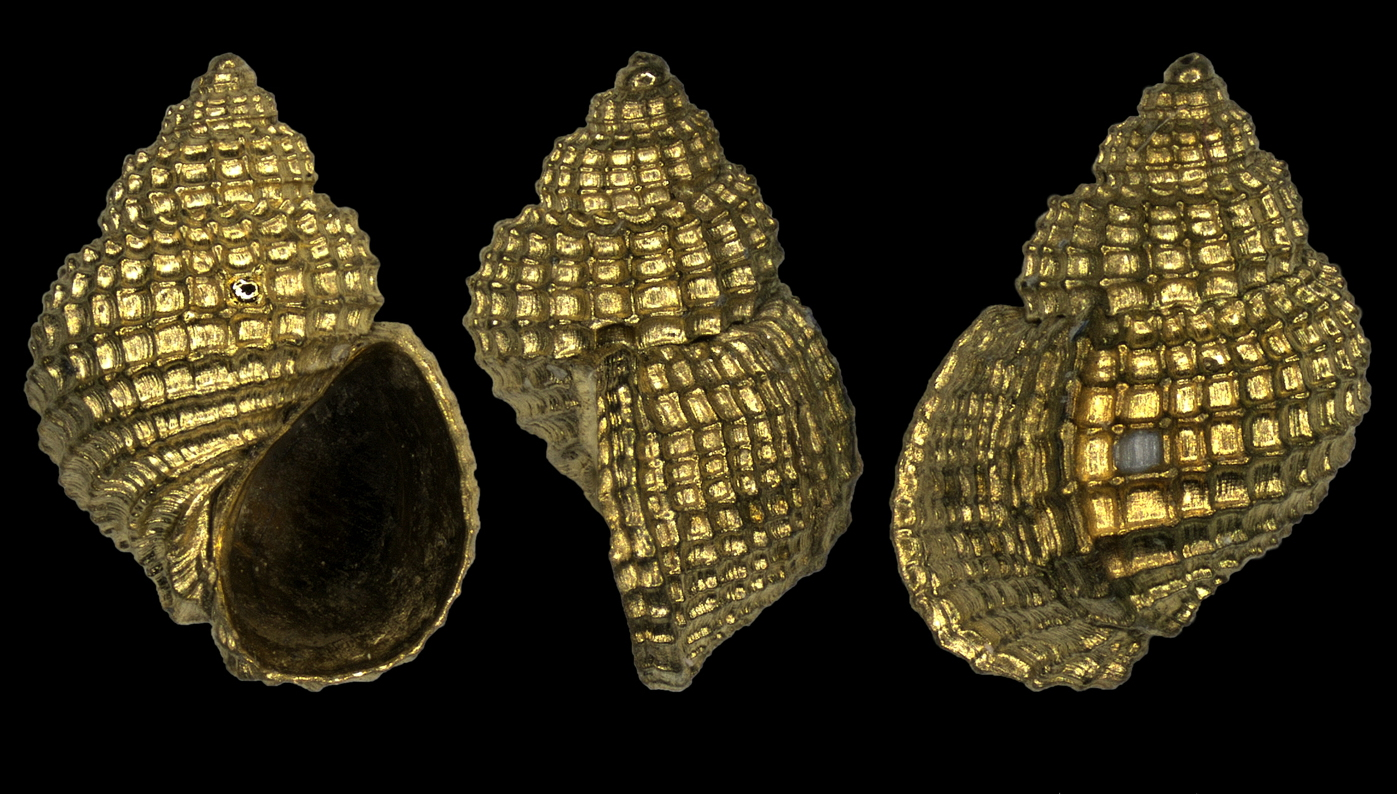
- Shell of Alvania francescoi (holotype in the MNHN, Paris)

Scientific classification
- Kingdom: Animalia
- Phylum: Mollusca
- Class: Gastropoda
- Subclass: Caenogastropoda
- Order: Littorinimorpha
- Superfamily: Rissooidea
- Family: Rissoidae
- Genus: Alvania
- Species: †A. francescoi

Binomial name
- †Alvania francescoi Garilli, 2008

= Alvania francescoi =

Species of gastropod

Alvania francescoi is an extinct species of minute sea snail, a marine gastropod mollusk or micromollusk in the family Rissoidae.

== Description ==
The shell is small, sturdy, and conical-ovate, reaching a maximum height of 4.8 mm (4.3 mm in holotype) and a width of 3.1 mm (2.8 mm in holotype). The protoconch is multispiral with a partially immersed nucleus. Protoconch I consists of about 0.8 whorls sculptured by 5–6 fine spiral lirae interspersed with microscopic granules. Protoconch II consists of about 1.2 whorls sculptured by irregular pimples. The teleoconch consists of 3.8–4.6 convex whorls with strong cancellate sculpture formed by the intersection of equally developed spiral cords and axial ribs. Cords are narrow and well raised, numbering 13–15 on the body whorl. Axial ribs number 24–32 on the penultimate whorl. The last whorl is well-developed, comprising about three fourths of shell height, and may bear single or double varices. The aperture is wide and ovate. The outer lip is orthocline, internally smooth, and externally markedly thickened by a strong rim covered by spiral cords.

== Etymology ==
The species is named in honor of both Francesco Garilli senior, the author's father and first mentor, and Francesco Garilli junior, the author's son.

== Distribution ==
Fossils of A. francescoi are known only from the type locality: the lower Pleistocene deposits of Cartiera Mulino, near Vittoria in the province of Ragusa, southeastern Sicily, Italy. The specimens were found in the phanerogam-rich 3D1 layer, which represents a shallow marine environment with Posidonia beds.

== Remarks ==
Alvania francescoi shows a galeodiniform shape with an inflated last whorl and a large aperture, but its spiral sculpture does not markedly prevail over the axial sculpture as in typical Galeodina. Its strongly cancellated sculptural pattern resembles that of A. cimicoides, which however has a more slender shell and a proportionally smaller aperture with denticulations on the inner part of the outer lip. It can also be compared with the sympatric A. rosariae, described in the same publication.

== Paleoecology ==
As a member of the family Rissoidae, A. francescoi likely inhabited shallow marine environments. The Pleistocene strata in Sicily where its fossils were found represent a period of significant climatic fluctuation, which influenced the distribution of marine gastropods in the Mediterranean.
