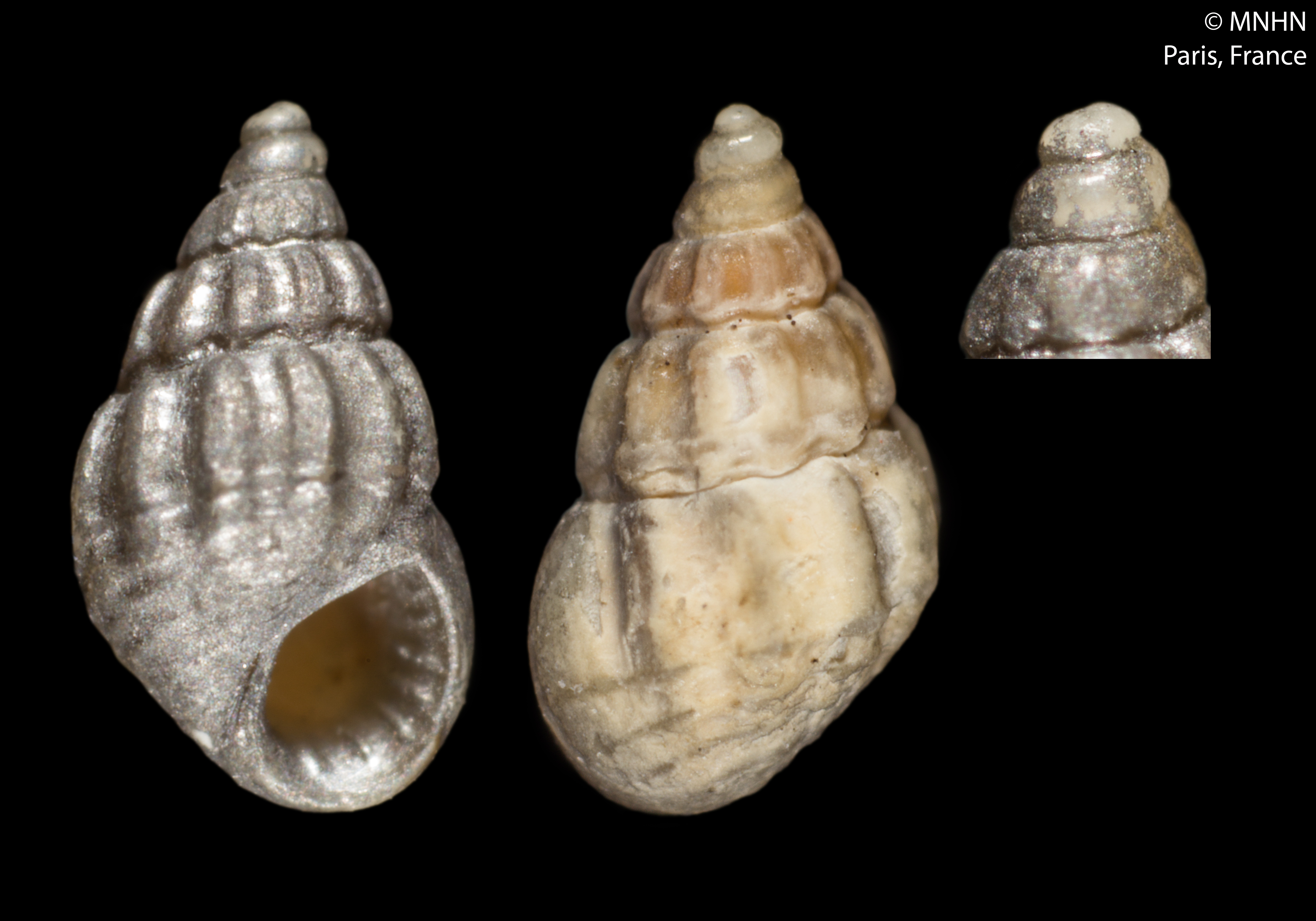
- Shell of Alvania dorbignyi (holotype at MNHN, Paris)

Scientific classification
- Kingdom: Animalia
- Phylum: Mollusca
- Class: Gastropoda
- Subclass: Caenogastropoda
- Order: Littorinimorpha
- Superfamily: Rissooidea
- Family: Rissoidae
- Genus: Alvania
- Species: A. dorbignyi

Binomial name
- Alvania dorbignyi (Audouin, 1826)

Synonyms
- Alvania (Alvanolira) dorbignyii (Audouin, 1827); Alvania orbignyi (misspelling); Rissoa dorbignyi Audouin, 1826

= Alvania dorbignyi =

Species of gastropod

Alvania dorbignyi is a species of small sea snail, a marine gastropod mollusk or micromollusk in the family Rissoidae.

Subspecies: Alvania dorbignyi perversa F. Nordsieck, 1972: synonym of Alvania perversa F. Nordsieck, 1972 (superseded rank)

== Description ==
The length of the shell attains 2.45 mm, its diameter 1.35 mm.

== Distribution ==
This species occurs in the Mediterranean Sea (Greece, Egypt), but it also may be an Indo-Pacific immigrant. It is considered cryptogenic.
