= Alvania perversa =

Scientific classification
- Kingdom: Animalia
- Phylum: Mollusca
- Class: Gastropoda
- Subclass: Caenogastropoda
- Order: Littorinimorpha
- Superfamily: Rissooidea
- Family: Rissoidae
- Genus: Alvania
- Species: A. perversa

Binomial name
- Alvania perversa F. Nordsieck, 1972

Synonyms
- Alvania (Alvanolira) dorbignyii perversa F. Nordsieck, 1972 superseded rank; Alvania dorbignyi perversa F. Nordsieck, 1972 superseded rank

Species of gastropod

Alvania perversa is a species of minute sea snail, a marine gastropod mollusk or micromollusk in the family Rissoidae.

== Distribution ==
This species occurs in the Mediterranean Sea (off the coast of Israel)
