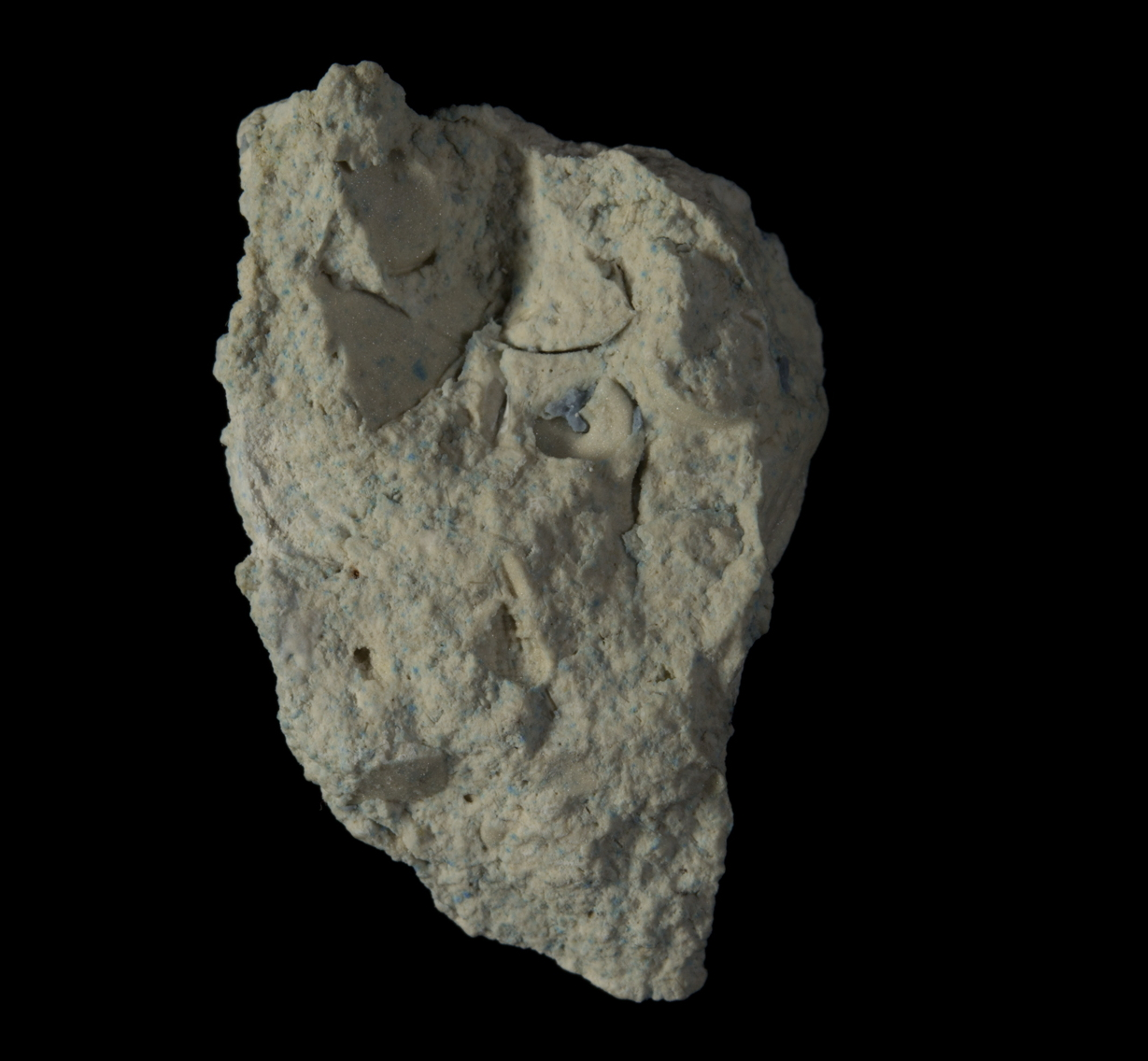
- Impression of the shell of Alvania venus on a rock.

Scientific classification
- Kingdom: Animalia
- Phylum: Mollusca
- Class: Gastropoda
- Subclass: Caenogastropoda
- Order: Littorinimorpha
- Superfamily: Rissooidea
- Family: Rissoidae
- Genus: Alvania
- Species: †A. venus

Binomial name
- †Alvania venus (d'Orbigny, 1852)

Synonyms
- † Alvania (Turbona) venus (d'Orbigny, 1852); † Rissoa venus d'Orbigny, 1852

= Alvania venus =

Species of gastropod

Alvania venus is an extinct species of minute sea snail, a marine gastropod mollusc or micromollusk in the family Rissoidae.

Variety

- † Alvania venus var. robusta Calas, 1949: synonym of † Alvania robusta Calas, 1949 (raised to full species)

== Distribution ==
Fossils of this species were in Miocene strata in Western France.
