= Alvania robusta =

Scientific classification
- Kingdom: Animalia
- Phylum: Mollusca
- Class: Gastropoda
- Subclass: Caenogastropoda
- Order: Littorinimorpha
- Superfamily: Rissooidea
- Family: Rissoidae
- Genus: Alvania
- Species: †A. robusta

Binomial name
- †Alvania robusta Calas, 1949

Synonyms
- † Alvania venus var. robusta Calas, 1949 (raised to full species)

Species of gastropod

Alvania robusta is an extinct species of minute sea snail, a marine gastropod mollusk or micromollusk in the family Rissoidae.

== Distribution ==
Fossils have been found in Upper Miocene strata in northwestern France.
