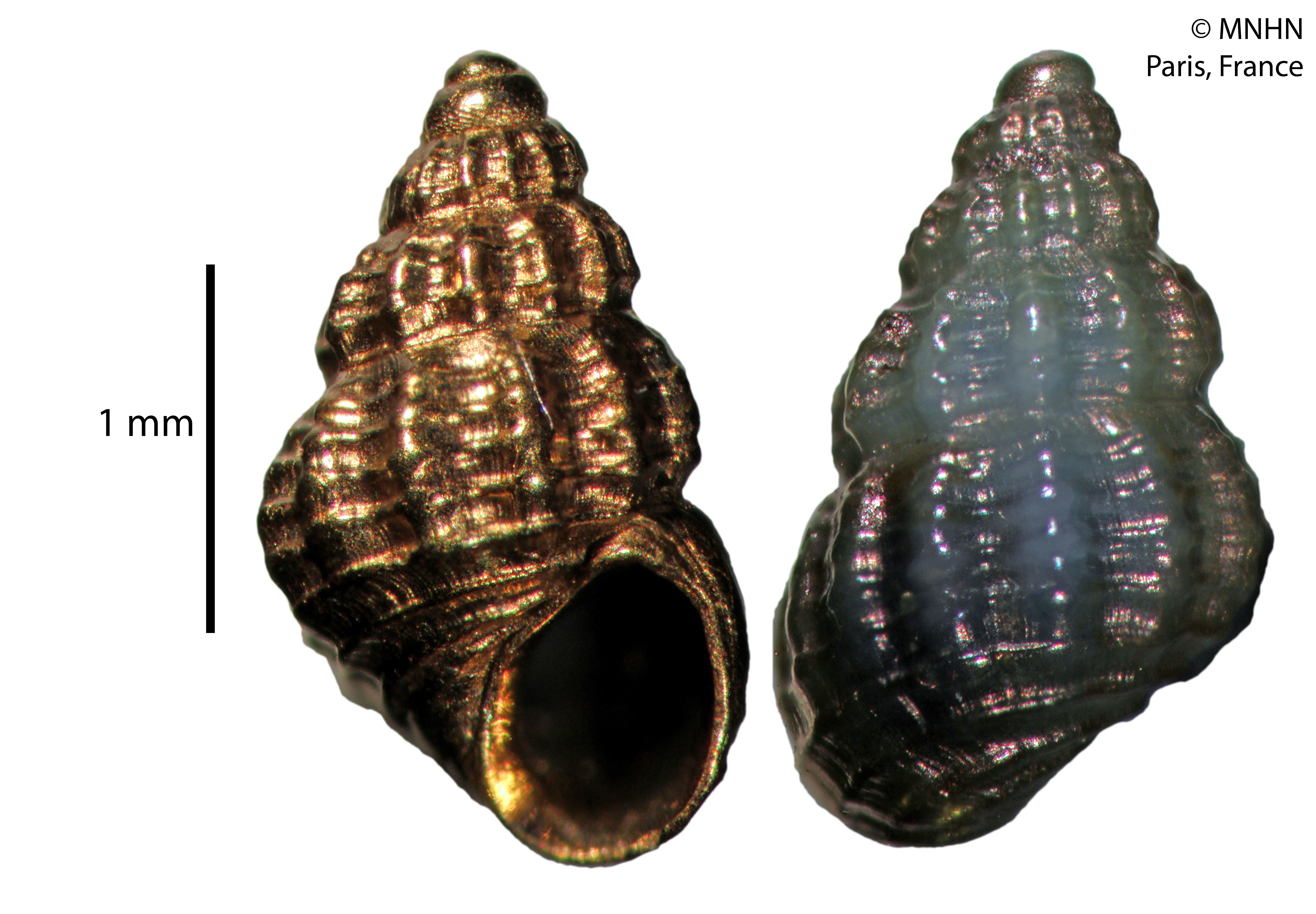
- Shell of Alvania fractospira (specimen at MNHN, Paris)

Scientific classification
- Kingdom: Animalia
- Phylum: Mollusca
- Class: Gastropoda
- Subclass: Caenogastropoda
- Order: Littorinimorpha
- Superfamily: Rissooidea
- Family: Rissoidae
- Genus: Alvania
- Species: A. fractospira

Binomial name
- Alvania fractospira (Oberling, 1970)

= Alvania fractospira =

Species of gastropod

Alvania fractospira is a species of small sea snail, a marine gastropod mollusk or micromollusk in the family Rissoidae.

== Description ==
The length of the shell attains 2.3 mm.

== Distribution ==
This species occurs in the Adriatic Sea near Dubrovnik, Croatia.

It also occurs in the Mediterranean, for example, around Greece and Cyprus. See Marine Molluscs from Cyprus: new data and checklist (Ozturk, Buzzurro & Benli).
