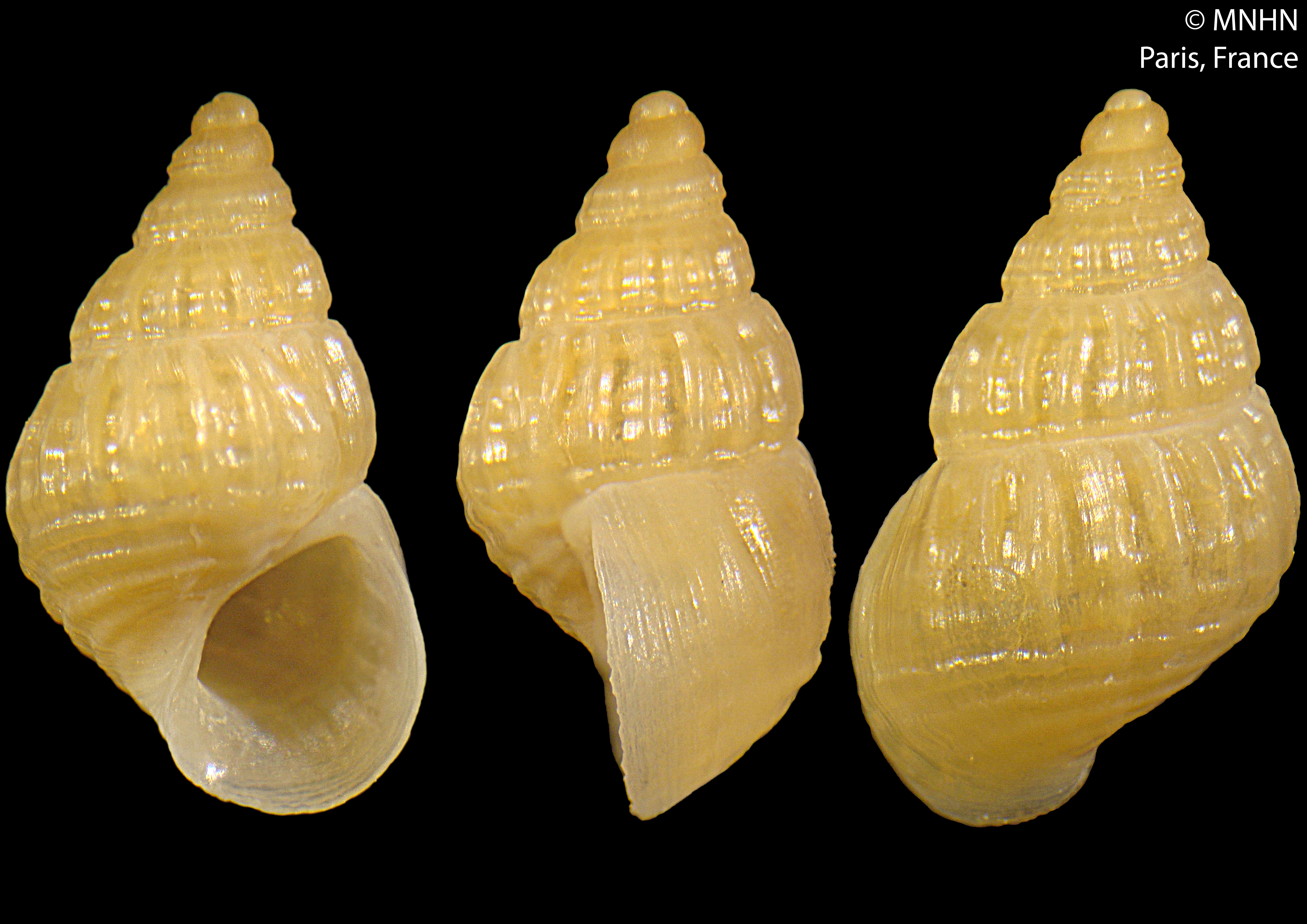
- Shell of Alvania bartolinorum (holotype at MNHN, Paris)

Scientific classification
- Kingdom: Animalia
- Phylum: Mollusca
- Class: Gastropoda
- Subclass: Caenogastropoda
- Order: Littorinimorpha
- Superfamily: Rissooidea
- Family: Rissoidae
- Genus: Alvania
- Species: A. bartolinorum

Binomial name
- Alvania bartolinorum Amati & Smriglio, 2019

Synonyms
- Alvania garrafensis sensu AA (Campani, BartoLini & Spanu, 2012

= Alvania bartolinorum =

Species of gastropod

Alvania bartolinorum is a species of small sea snail, a marine gastropod mollusk or micromollusk in the family Rissoidae.

== Description ==
The length of the shell attains 3.58 mm, its diameter is 2.16 mm.

== Distribution ==
This marine species occurs off Krk Island, Croatia.
