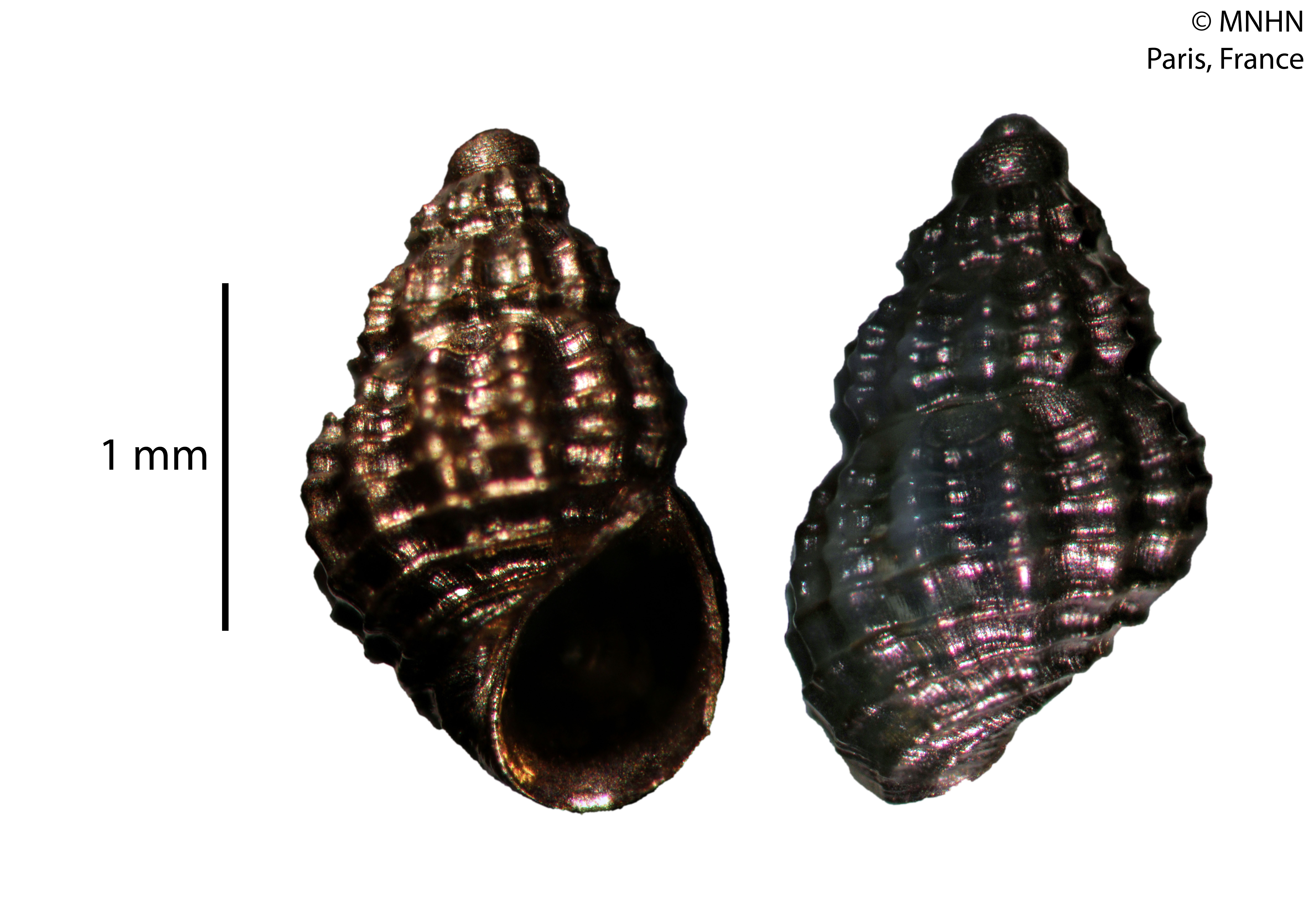
- Shell of Alvania datchaensis (specimen at MNHN, Paris)

Scientific classification
- Kingdom: Animalia
- Phylum: Mollusca
- Class: Gastropoda
- Subclass: Caenogastropoda
- Order: Littorinimorpha
- Superfamily: Rissooidea
- Family: Rissoidae
- Genus: Alvania
- Species: A. datchaensis

Binomial name
- Alvania datchaensis Amati & Oliverio, 1987

= Alvania datchaensis =

Species of gastropod

Alvania datchaensis is a species of small sea snail, a marine gastropod mollusk or micromollusk in the family Rissoidae.

== Description ==
The length of the shell varies between 2 mm and 3 mm.

== Distribution ==
The holotype of this marine species was found off Turkey. It occurs in the Eastern Mediterranean Sea and in the Aegean Sea off the island Rhodes.
