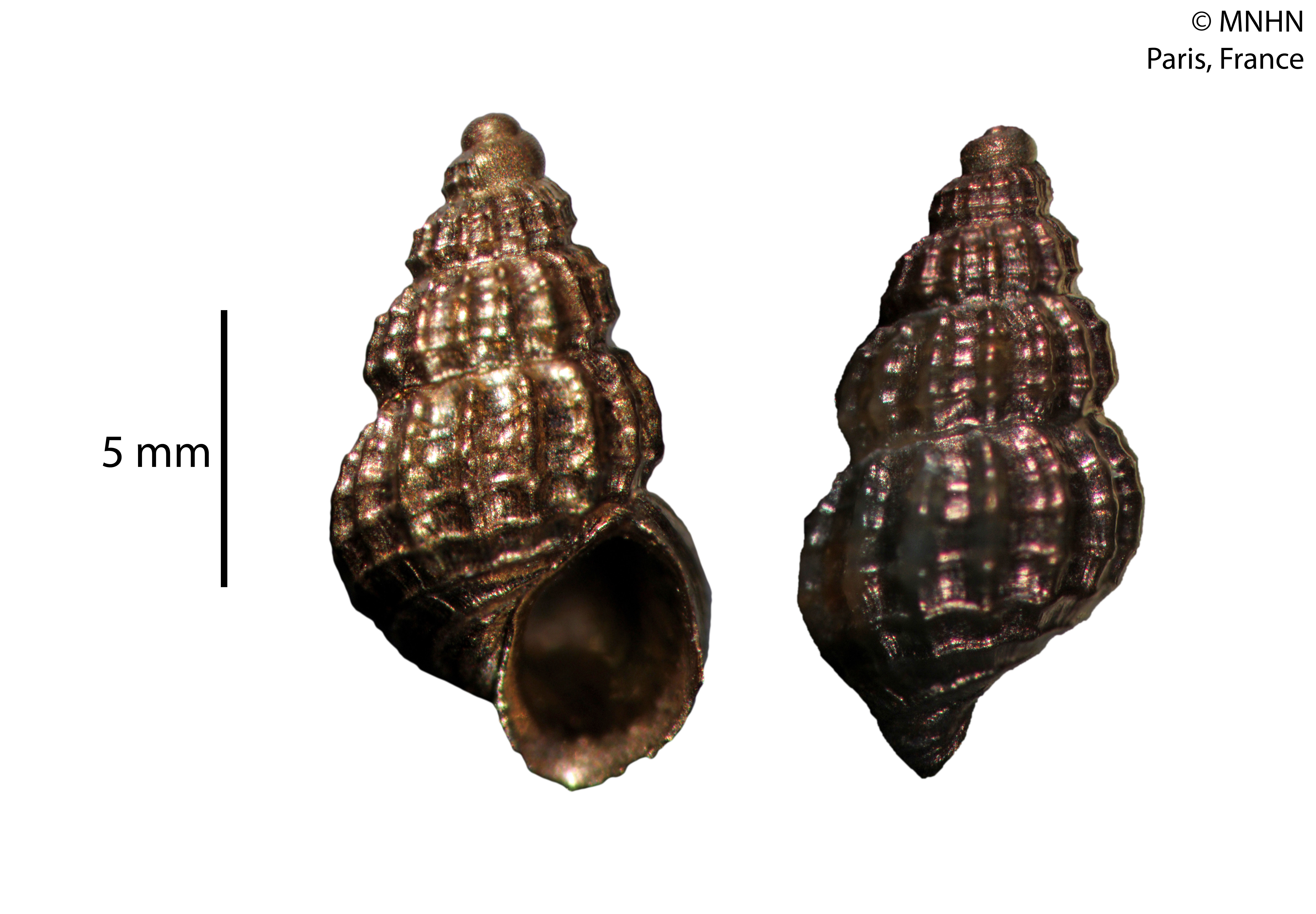
- Shell of Alvania campanii

Scientific classification
- Kingdom: Animalia
- Phylum: Mollusca
- Class: Gastropoda
- Subclass: Caenogastropoda
- Order: Littorinimorpha
- Family: Rissoidae
- Genus: Alvania
- Species: A. campanii

Binomial name
- Alvania campanii Tisselli & Giunchi, 2013

= Alvania campanii =

Species of gastropod

Alvania campanii is a species of minute sea snail, a marine gastropod mollusc or micromollusc in the family Rissoidae.

== Description ==
The shell has a turbinate shape with a rigid exterior and a notable protruding aperture. The typical length of the shell is around 2.3 mm.

== Distribution ==
This species occurs off the west coast of Turkey.
