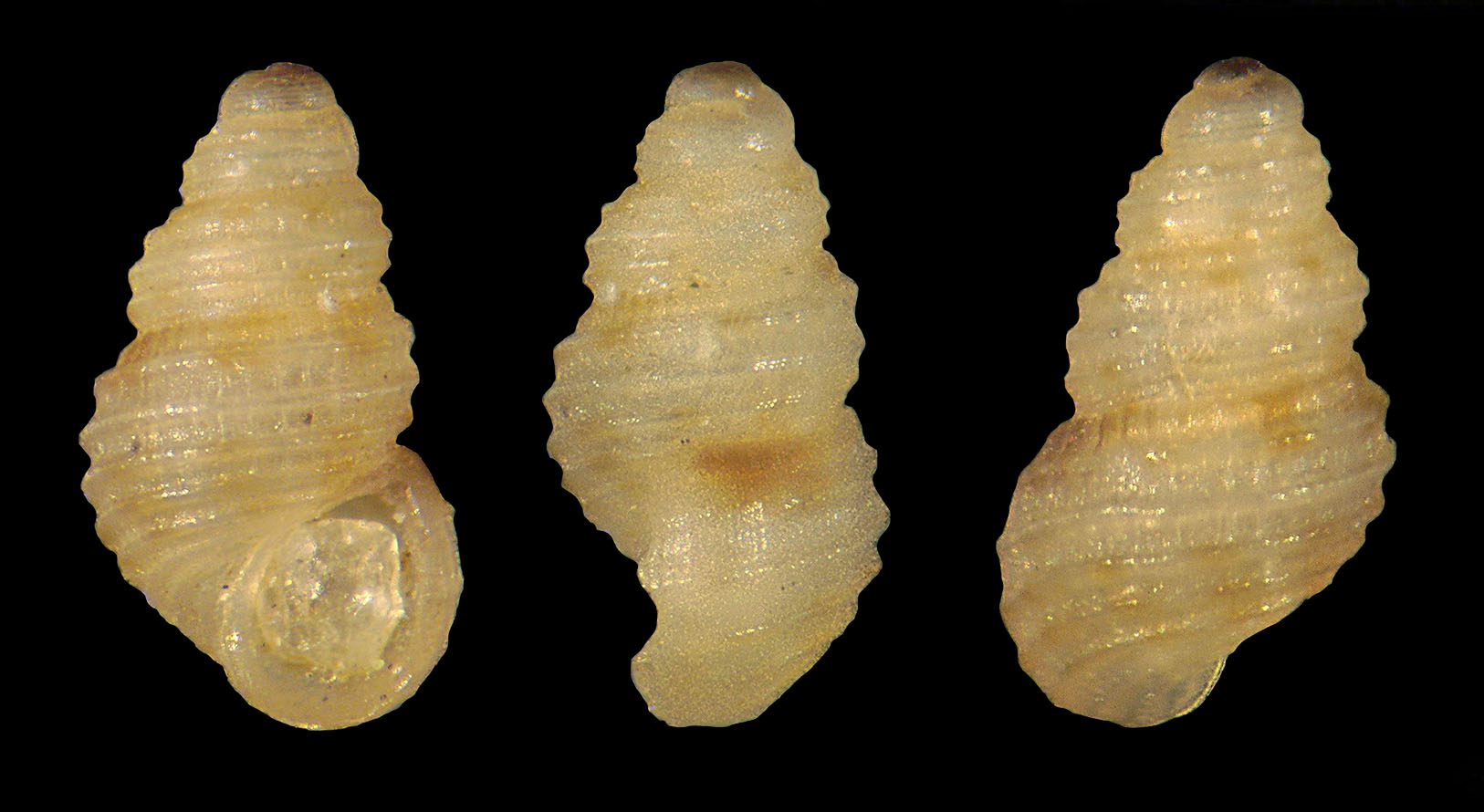
- Shell of Alvania pettinellii (holotype at MNHN, Paris)

Scientific classification
- Kingdom: Animalia
- Phylum: Mollusca
- Class: Gastropoda
- Subclass: Caenogastropoda
- Order: Littorinimorpha
- Superfamily: Rissooidea
- Family: Rissoidae
- Genus: Alvania
- Species: A. pettinellii

Binomial name
- Alvania pettinellii Amati, 2024

= Alvania pettinellii =

Species of gastropod

Alvania pettinellii is a species of minute sea snail, a marine gastropod mollusk or micromollusk in the family Rissoidae.

== Description ==
The length of the shell reaches approximately 1.57 mm in height and 0.92 mm in width.

== Distribution ==
This marine species occurs off Kenya.
