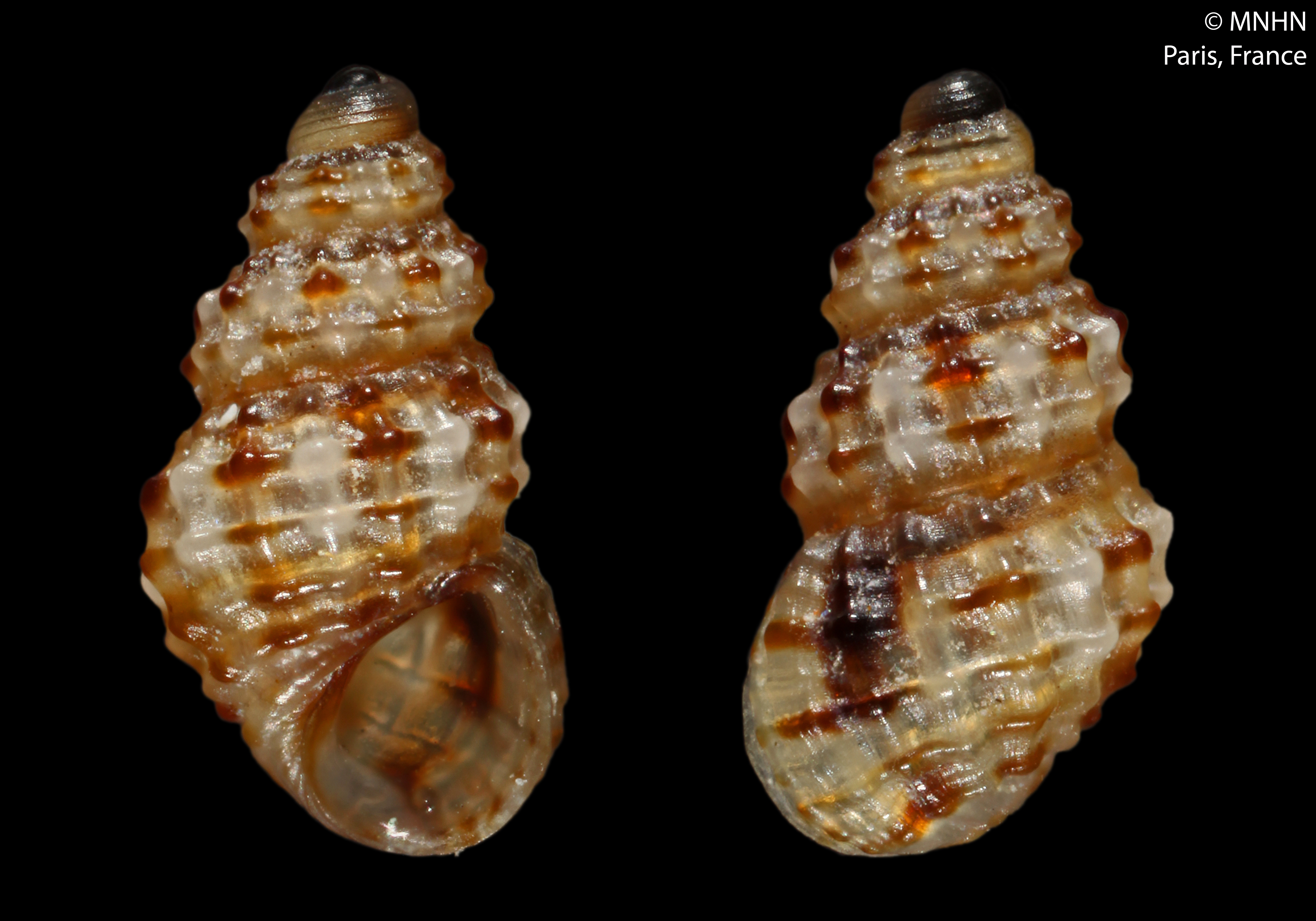
- Shell of Alvania hueti (holotype at MNHN, Paris)

Scientific classification
- Kingdom: Animalia
- Phylum: Mollusca
- Class: Gastropoda
- Subclass: Caenogastropoda
- Order: Littorinimorpha
- Family: Rissoidae
- Genus: Alvania
- Species: A. hueti

Binomial name
- Alvania hueti Bozzetti, 2017

= Alvania hueti =

Species of gastropod

Alvania hueti is a species of small sea snail, a marine gastropod mollusk or micromollusk in the family Rissoidae.

== Description ==
The length of the shell attains 2 mm.

== Distribution ==
This species occurs in the Indian Ocean off Réunion.
