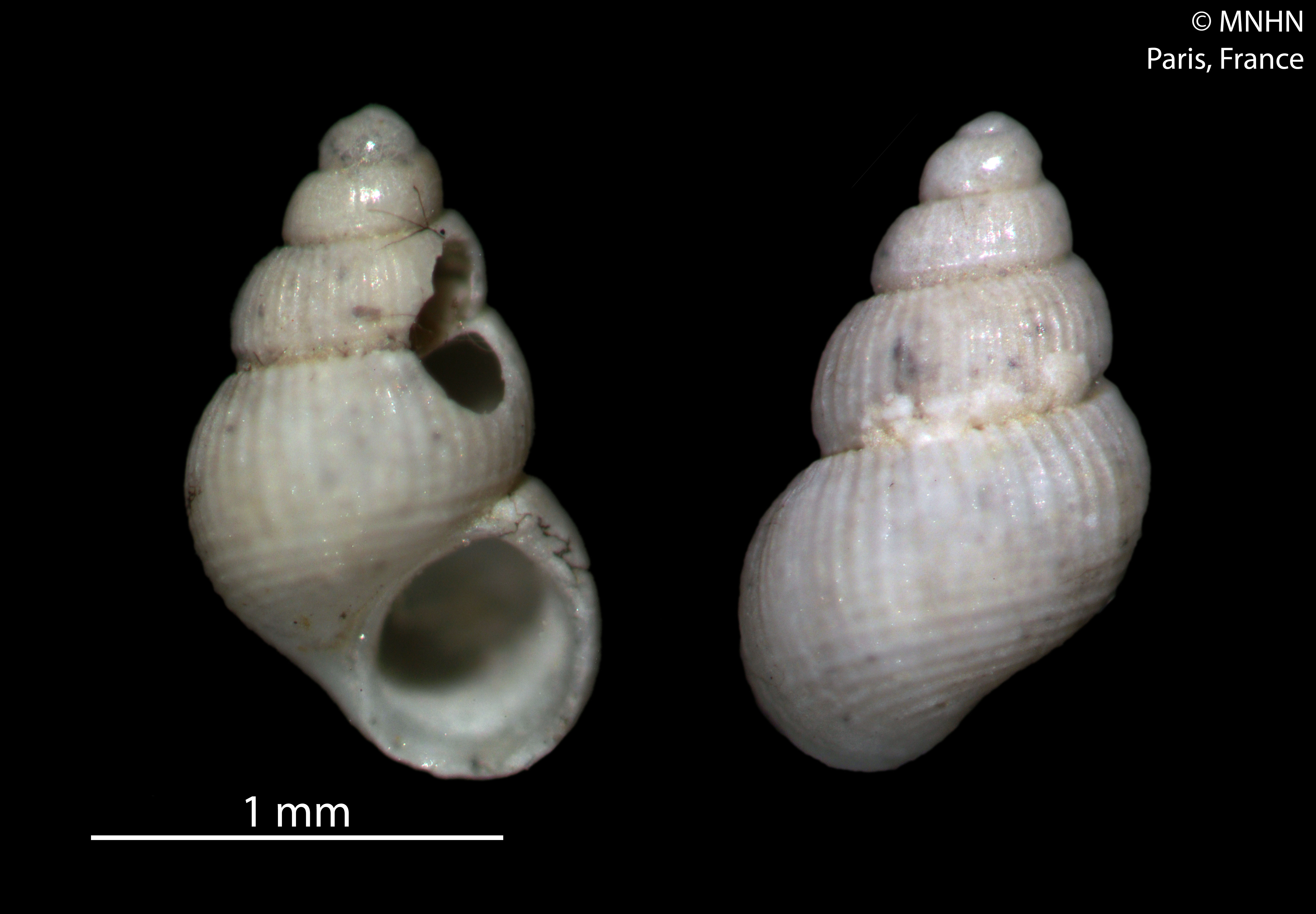
- Shell of Alvania valeriae (paratype at MNHN, Paris)

Scientific classification
- Kingdom: Animalia
- Phylum: Mollusca
- Class: Gastropoda
- Subclass: Caenogastropoda
- Order: Littorinimorpha
- Superfamily: Rissooidea
- Family: Rissoidae
- Genus: Alvania
- Species: A. valeriae

Binomial name
- Alvania valeriae Absalão, 1994

= Alvania valeriae =

Species of gastropod

Alvania valeriae is a species of minute sea snail, a marine gastropod mollusk or micromollusk in the family Rissoidae.

== Distribution ==
This species occurs in the Atlantic Ocean off Brazil.
