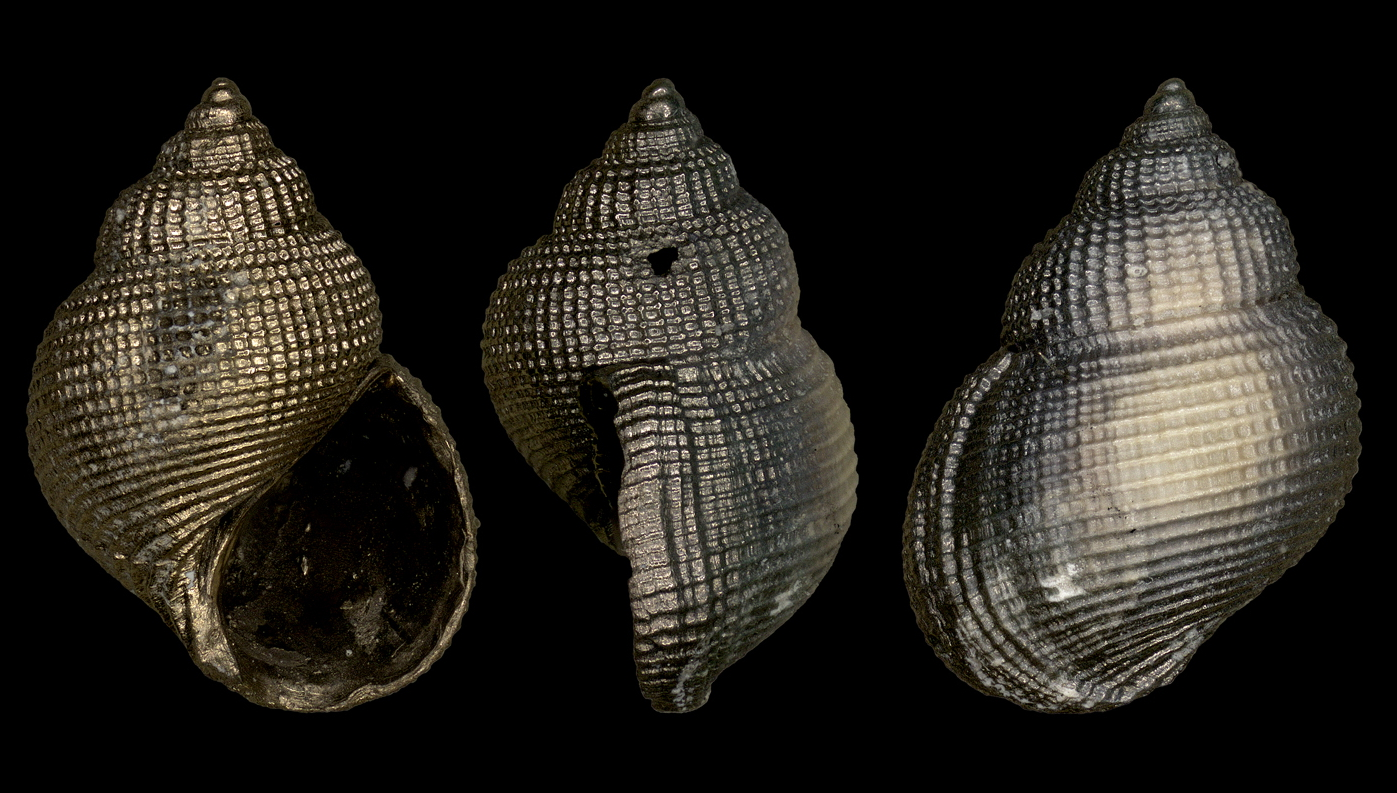
- Shell of Alvania rosariae (holotype in the MNHN, Paris)

Scientific classification
- Kingdom: Animalia
- Phylum: Mollusca
- Class: Gastropoda
- Subclass: Caenogastropoda
- Order: Littorinimorpha
- Superfamily: Rissooidea
- Family: Rissoidae
- Genus: Alvania
- Species: †A. rosariae

Binomial name
- †Alvania rosariae Garilli, 2008

= Alvania rosariae =

Species of gastropod

Alvania rosariae is an extinct species of minute sea snail, a marine gastropod mollusk or micromollusk in the family Rissoidae.

== Description ==
The length of the shell attains 5 mm, its diameter is 3.5 mm.

== Distribution ==
Fossils were found in Pleistocene strata in Sicily, Italy.
