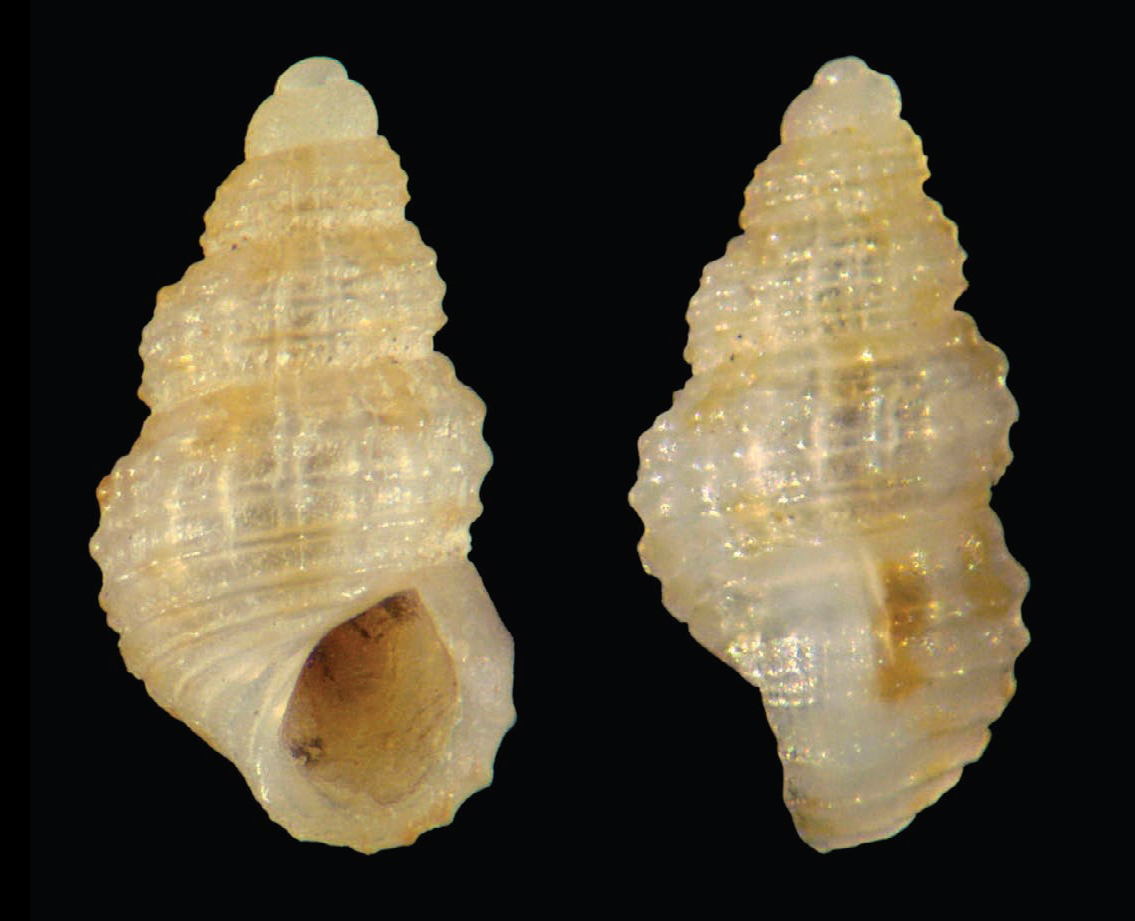
- Shell of Alvania uapou (hoplotype at MNHN, Paris)

Scientific classification
- Kingdom: Animalia
- Phylum: Mollusca
- Class: Gastropoda
- Subclass: Caenogastropoda
- Order: Littorinimorpha
- Superfamily: Rissooidea
- Family: Rissoidae
- Genus: Alvania
- Species: A. uapou

Binomial name
- Alvania uapou Amati, Di Giulio & Oliverio, 2023

= Alvania uapou =

Species of gastropod

Alvania uapou is a species of small sea snail, a marine gastropod mollusk or micromollusk in the family Rissoidae.

== Description ==
The length of the shell attains 1.7 mm.

== Distribution ==
This species occurs off the Marquesas Islands, French Polynesia.
