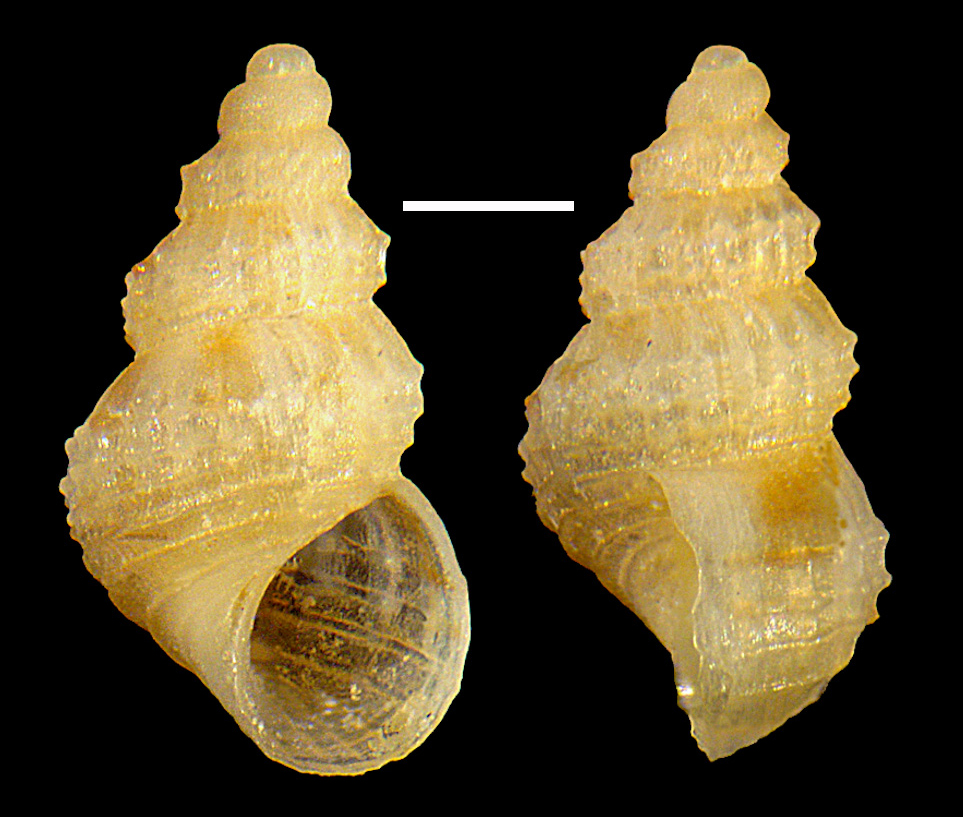
- Shell of Alvania pizzinii (holotype atMNHN, Paris)

Scientific classification
- Kingdom: Animalia
- Phylum: Mollusca
- Class: Gastropoda
- Subclass: Caenogastropoda
- Order: Littorinimorpha
- Superfamily: Rissooidea
- Family: Rissoidae
- Genus: Alvania
- Species: A. pizzinii

Binomial name
- Alvania pizzinii Amati, Smriglio & Oliverio, 2020

= Alvania pizzinii =

Species of gastropod

Alvania pizzinii is a species of minute sea snail, a marine gastropod mollusk or micromollusk in the family Rissoidae.

== Description ==
The length of the shell attains 2.3 mm.

== Distribution ==
This species occurs in the Mediterranean Sea off Sicily.
