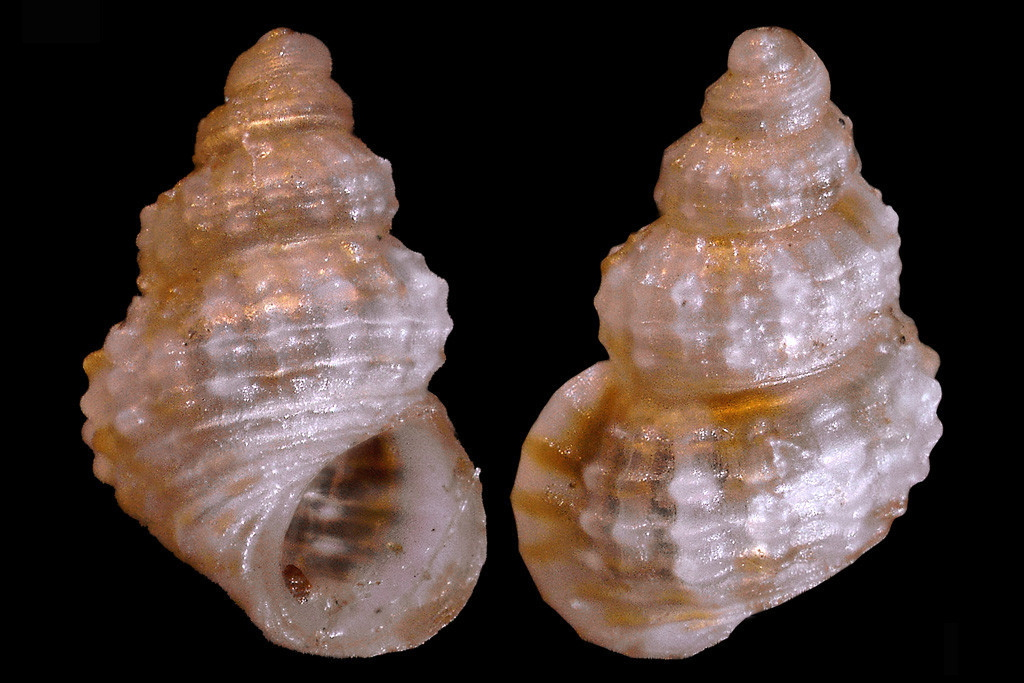
- Shell of Alvania angioyi

Scientific classification
- Kingdom: Animalia
- Phylum: Mollusca
- Class: Gastropoda
- Subclass: Caenogastropoda
- Order: Littorinimorpha
- Family: Rissoidae
- Genus: Alvania
- Species: A. angioyi

Binomial name
- Alvania angioyi van Aartsen, 1982

= Alvania angioyi =

Species of gastropod

Alvania angioyi is a species of small sea snail, a marine gastropod mollusk or micromollusk in the family Rissoidae.

== Description ==
The length of the shell varies between 1.3 mm and 2 mm.

== Distribution ==
This species occurs in the Atlantic Ocean off the Azores and the Canary Islands.
