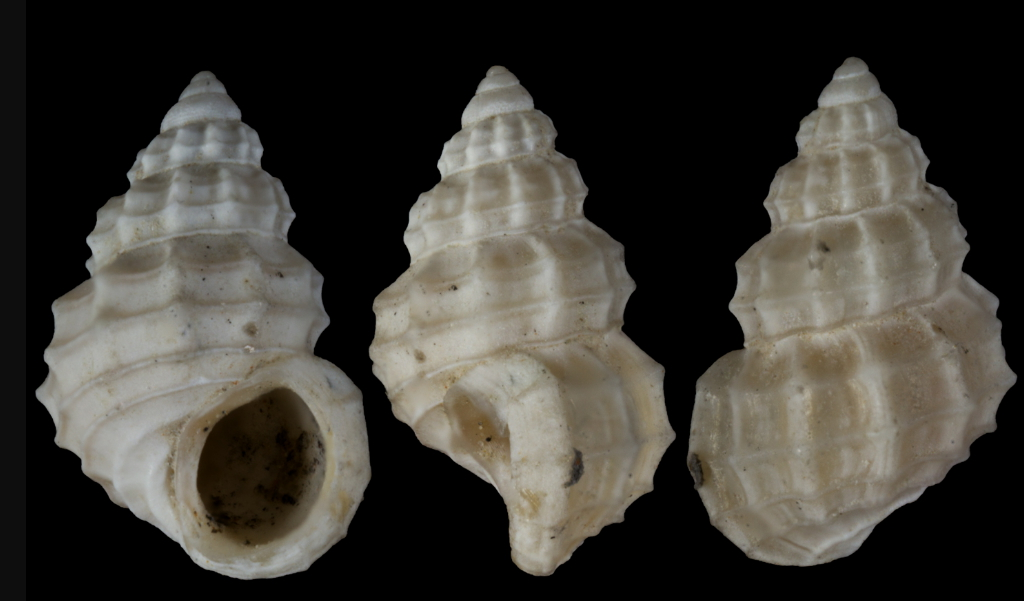
- Shell of Alvania diadema (specimen at the MNHN, Paris)

Scientific classification
- Kingdom: Animalia
- Phylum: Mollusca
- Class: Gastropoda
- Subclass: Caenogastropoda
- Order: Littorinimorpha
- Superfamily: Rissooidea
- Family: Rissoidae
- Genus: Alvania
- Species: †A. diadema

Binomial name
- †Alvania diadema De Stefani & Pantanelli, 1888

= Alvania diadema =

Species of gastropod

Alvania diadema is an extinct species of minute sea snail, a marine gastropod mollusc or micromollusk in the family Rissoidae.

== Distribution ==
Fossils of this marine species were found in Pliocene strata off Siena, Italy and the Alpes-Maritimes, France.
