= Alvania lampra =

Scientific classification
- Kingdom: Animalia
- Phylum: Mollusca
- Class: Gastropoda
- Subclass: Caenogastropoda
- Order: Littorinimorpha
- Superfamily: Rissooidea
- Family: Rissoidae
- Genus: Alvania
- Species: A. lampra

Binomial name
- Alvania lampra (Dall, 1927)

Synonyms
- Rissoa (Cingula) lampra Dall, 1927 (basionym); Rissoa lampra Dall, 1927 (Alvania accepted as genus)

Species of gastropod

Alvania lampra is a species of small sea snail, a marine gastropod mollusk or micromollusk in the family Rissoidae.

== Description ==
The length of the shell attains 3.6 mm, its diameter 1.6 mm.

(Original description) The shell has about the size of Alvania campta but with a more drawn out body whorl and a less constricted suture. It is white, acute, with a small, somewhat irregular glassy protoconch and five subsequent neatly rounded whorls. The axial sculpture consists of numerous fine, thread like nearly vertical riblets crossing the early whorls and reaching near the periphery on the body whorl. They are more or less evident on different specimens. The spiral sculpture consists of five even faint striae, covering the whole surface. The base of the shell is rounded and imperforate. The aperture is ovate, not oblique. The margin is simple, thin and united over the body in the adult by a thin layer of enamel.

== Distribution ==
This marine species occurs in the Atlantic Ocean off Georgia, USA.
