= Alvania campta =

Scientific classification
- Kingdom: Animalia
- Phylum: Mollusca
- Class: Gastropoda
- Subclass: Caenogastropoda
- Order: Littorinimorpha
- Superfamily: Rissooidea
- Family: Rissoidae
- Genus: Alvania
- Species: A. campta

Binomial name
- Alvania campta (Dall, 1927)

Synonyms
- Rissoa (Cingula) campta Dall, 1927 (basionym); Rissoa campta Dall, 1927 (Alvania accepted as genus)

Species of gastropod

Alvania campta is a species of small sea snail, a marine gastropod mollusk or micromollusk in the family Rissoidae.

== Description ==
The length of the shell attains 4 mm, its diameter 1.5 mm.

(Original description) The small shell is translucent white and slender. It has a glassy protoconch of about two whorls and four subsequent well-rounded whorls, separated by a deep suture. The axial sculpture consists of numerous minute close-set vertical riblets, hardly visible without a lens, crossed by microscopic spiral striae over the whole surface. The base is rounded and imperforate. The lips are simple, not meeting over the body.

== Distribution ==
This marine species occurs in the Atlantic Ocean off Georgia, USA.
