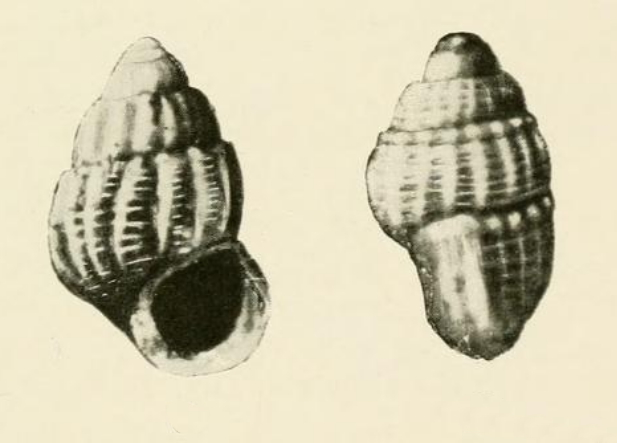
- Shell of Alvania vinosula (holotype)

Scientific classification
- Kingdom: Animalia
- Phylum: Mollusca
- Class: Gastropoda
- Subclass: Caenogastropoda
- Order: Littorinimorpha
- Superfamily: Rissooidea
- Family: Rissoidae
- Genus: Alvania
- Species: †A. vinosula

Binomial name
- †Alvania vinosula F. M. Anderson & G. D. Hanna, 1925

= Alvania vinosula =

Species of gastropod

Alvania vinosula is an extinct species of minute sea snail, a marine gastropod mollusc or micromollusk in the family Rissoidae.

== Description ==
The length of the shell attains 1.6 mm, its diameter 1 mm.

(Original description) The small shell has a conical shape. The sides of the spire are slightly convex. The shell contains five convex whorls. The suture is deeply impressed. The protoconch is composed of about two smooth whorls. The remainder of the shell is heavily sculptured, but with no definite line of demarkation between. The body whorl shows 17 heavy, axial, slightly oblique ribs, which extend around the periphery and to the imperforate umbilical region. There is a slight constriction just beneath the suture, scarcely more than an indentation on the ribs. On the upper whorls the ribs extend from suture to suture. The ribs are rounded on top, and separated by concave interspaces much wider than themselves. The interspaces are marked by spiral threads smaller than the ribs. The spiral sculpture is heaviest on the body whorl on which it covers the base as well as the sides. The aperture is rounded and slightly elliptical. The outer lip is heavily calloused on the outside. The peristome is continuous on the parietal wall, but closely appressed.

== Distribution ==
Fossils of this species were in Eocene strata in California, USA.
