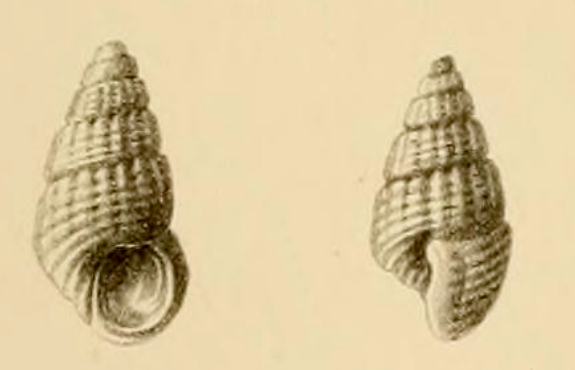
- Shell of Alvania stigmata (holotype)

Scientific classification
- Kingdom: Animalia
- Phylum: Mollusca
- Class: Gastropoda
- Subclass: Caenogastropoda
- Order: Littorinimorpha
- Superfamily: Rissooidea
- Family: Rissoidae
- Genus: Alvania
- Species: A. stigmata

Binomial name
- Alvania stigmata Frauenfeld, 1867

Synonyms
- Alvania stigmatica Frauenfeld, 1867 (original incorrect spelling)

= Alvania stigmata =

Species of gastropod

Alvania stigmata is a species of small sea snail, a marine gastropod mollusk or micromollusk in the family Rissoidae.

== Description ==
The length of the shell attains 2 mm, its diameter 1 mm.

(Original description in Latin and German) The conical shell is bulbous, obtuse and eroded. It is milky and somewhat translucent, with three to four spiral lines. The shell contains 5½ whorls, constricted at the suture. There are 16-17 straight vertical riblets, which are thicker on the upper part of the whorl and almost completely flattened on the lower part, with three or four more, less transparent visible spiral lines. On the body whorl around the umbilicus area there are three more very marked ones. The aperture is roundish. The outer lip contains a varix.

In specimens that have been lightly rubbed, the erpidermis is painted reddish-brown, and the protoconch also has a reddish-brown color.

== Distribution ==
This species occurs in the Indian Ocean off the Nicobar Islands.
