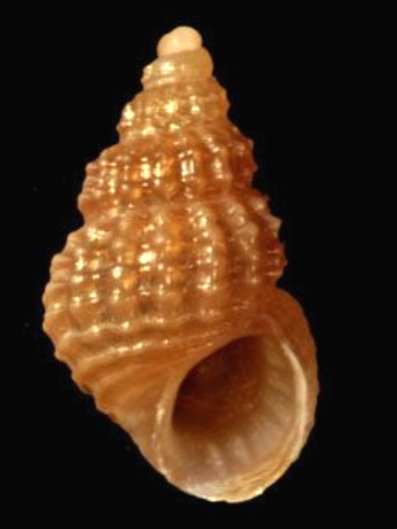
- Shell of Alvania lanciae (specimen at the Natural History Museum, Rotterdam)

Scientific classification
- Kingdom: Animalia
- Phylum: Mollusca
- Class: Gastropoda
- Subclass: Caenogastropoda
- Order: Littorinimorpha
- Superfamily: Rissooidea
- Family: Rissoidae
- Genus: Alvania
- Species: A. lanciae

Binomial name
- Alvania lanciae (Calcara, 1845)

Synonyms
- Alvania arguta Locard & Caziot, 1900; Alvania consociella Monterosato, 1884; Alvania schwartzii (Aradas & Benoit, 1874); Rissoa lanciae Calcara, 1845 (original combination); Rissoa schwartzii Aradas & Benoit, 1874

= Alvania lanciae =

Species of gastropod

Alvania lanciae is a species of small sea snail, a marine gastropod mollusc or micromollusk in the family Rissoidae.

== Description ==
The length of the shell attains 3 mm.

The shell is yellowish, orange brown or yellowish white. It is longitudinally distantly costate, spirally lirate, and forming nodules on the ribs. The base of the shell is without ribs, but spirally striate. The shell contains 5-6, very convex whorls. The suture is deep and channeled. The outer lip is externally thickened.

== Distribution ==
This species occurs in the Aegean Sea off the Cyclades, Greece; in the Mediterranean Sea off Corsica and Sardinia; also in the Sea of Marmara.
