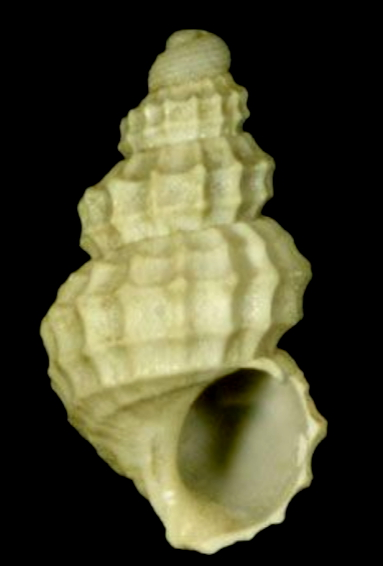
- Shell of Alvania marchadi (specimen at the Natural History Museum, Rotterdam)

Scientific classification
- Kingdom: Animalia
- Phylum: Mollusca
- Class: Gastropoda
- Subclass: Caenogastropoda
- Order: Littorinimorpha
- Superfamily: Rissooidea
- Family: Rissoidae
- Genus: Alvania
- Species: A. marchadi

Binomial name
- Alvania marchadi (Gofas, 1999)

= Alvania marchadi =

Species of gastropod

Alvania marchadi is a species of minute sea snail, a marine gastropod mollusk or micromollusk in the family Rissoidae. It is named after Igor Marche-Marchad.

== Description ==
The length of the shell ranges between 2.25 mm and 2.95 mm and is thickened with a strong rim. The exterior of the shell contains rigid spirals, while the interior is smooth.

The protoconch has 1–3.1.5 convex whorls and "7 spiral flat cords...formed by minute granules".

The teleoconch has 3.3-4.2 convex wholes with "strong, widely spaced, nearly vertical axial folds." The body whorl is rounded with eight spiral and axial folds that fade "towards the periumbilical area".

== Distribution ==
This marine species occurs in the Atlantic Ocean between the coast off Dakar, Senegal and the Sahara, at depths between 80 m and 250 m.
