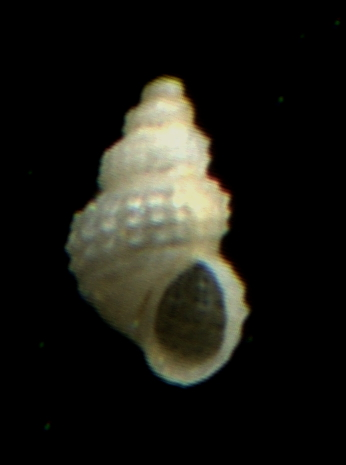
- Shell of Alvania scabra

Scientific classification
- Kingdom: Animalia
- Phylum: Mollusca
- Class: Gastropoda
- Subclass: Caenogastropoda
- Order: Littorinimorpha
- Superfamily: Rissooidea
- Family: Rissoidae
- Genus: Alvania
- Species: A. scabra

Binomial name
- Alvania scabra (Philippi, 1844)

Synonyms
- Alvania oranica (Pallary, 1900); Alvaniella scabra (R. A. Philippi, 1844) superseded combination; Rissoa mutabilis Schwartz von Mohrenstern, 1868 (nomen nudum); Rissoa oranica Pallary, 1900; Rissoa scabra R. A. Philippi, 1844 superseded combination; Rissoa scabra var. rubescens Monterosato, 1877 (a colour variety; infrasubspecific)

= Alvania scabra =

Species of gastropod

Alvania scabra is a species of small sea snail, a marine gastropod mollusc or micromollusk in the family Rissoidae.

== Description ==
The length of the shell varies between 1.5 mm and 3 mm.

The shell is longitudinally plicate, obsolete below, spirally lirate, forming mamillary tubercles. It contains 6 slightly convex whorls. The shell is white, maculated with chestnut. The outer lip is sulcate within, varicose externally.

== Distribution ==
This species occurs in the Mediterranean Sea (Spain, Algeria, Italy, Greece); in the Atlantic Ocean off Madeira.
