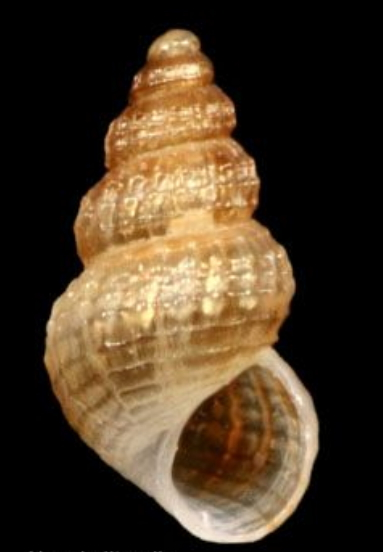
- Shell of Alvania litoralis (specimen at the Natural History Museum, Rotterdam)

Scientific classification
- Kingdom: Animalia
- Phylum: Mollusca
- Class: Gastropoda
- Subclass: Caenogastropoda
- Order: Littorinimorpha
- Superfamily: Rissooidea
- Family: Rissoidae
- Genus: Alvania
- Species: A. litoralis

Binomial name
- Alvania litoralis (Nordsieck, 1972)

Synonyms
- † Actonia granulosculpta (L. Seguenza, 1903) (dubious synonym); Alvania gittenbergeri van Aartsen & Menkhorst, 1988; † Alvania granulosculpta (L. Seguenza, 1903) (dubious synonym); Manzonia (Actonia) granulosculpta L. Seguenza, 1903 (dubious synonym); Manzonia granulosculpta L. Seguenza, 1903 (dubious synonym); Turbona elegantissima litoralis F. Nordsieck, 1972

= Alvania litoralis =

Species of gastropod

Alvania litoralis is a species of minute sea snail, a marine gastropod mollusk or micromollusk in the family Rissoidae.

== Description ==
The shell attains a length of 3 mm.

== Distribution ==
This species occurs in the Ionian Sea off Cephalonia Island, Greece; also off Turkey.
