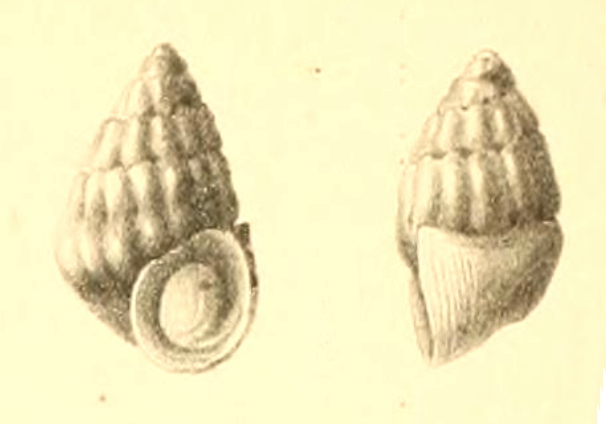
- Drawing of a shell of Alvania salebrosa (holotype)

Scientific classification
- Kingdom: Animalia
- Phylum: Mollusca
- Class: Gastropoda
- Subclass: Caenogastropoda
- Order: Littorinimorpha
- Superfamily: Rissooidea
- Family: Rissoidae
- Genus: Alvania
- Species: A. salebrosa

Binomial name
- Alvania salebrosa Frauenfeld, 1867

= Alvania salebrosa =

Species of gastropod

Alvania salebrosa is a species of small sea snail, a marine gastropod mollusk or micromollusk in the family Rissoidae.

== Description ==
The length of the shell attains 2.6 mm, its diameter 1.6 mm.

The thick, somewhat shining, brownish shell is depressed conical. It shows 10-12 strong, close, rounded ribs, subnodose at the suture, and on the angulated periphery of the body whorl. The shell contains 5½ flattened whorls that are rapidly increasing.

== Distribution ==
This marine species occurs off Sydney, Australia.
