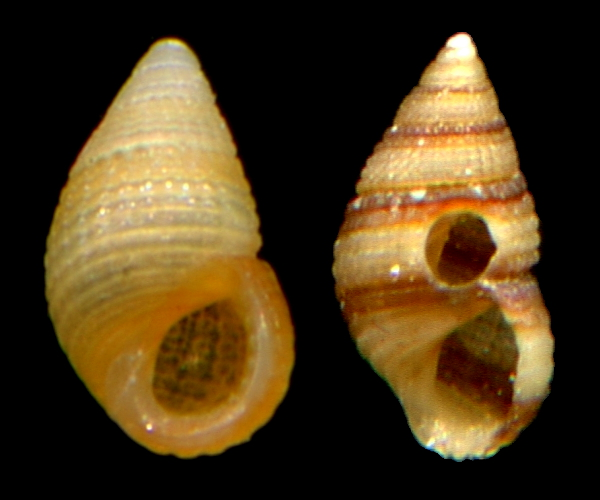
- Shell of Alvania geryonia

Scientific classification
- Kingdom: Animalia
- Phylum: Mollusca
- Class: Gastropoda
- Subclass: Caenogastropoda
- Order: Littorinimorpha
- Superfamily: Rissooidea
- Family: Rissoidae
- Genus: Alvania
- Species: A. geryonia

Binomial name
- Alvania geryonia (Nardo, 1847)

Synonyms
- Rissoa geryonia Nardo, 1847

= Alvania geryonia =

Species of sea snail

Alvania geryonia is a species of small sea snail, a marine gastropod mollusk or micromollusk in the family Rissoidae.

== Description ==
The length of the shell varies between 2.5 mm and 4 mm.

== Distribution ==
This species occurs in the Mediterranean Sea off Corsica, France, Tuscany, Italy and Greece; also in the Atlantic Ocean off the Azores.
