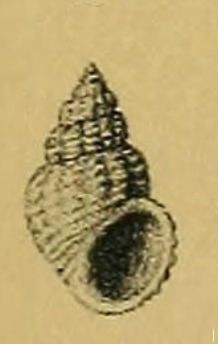
- Shell of Alvania asperula (holotype)

Scientific classification
- Kingdom: Animalia
- Phylum: Mollusca
- Class: Gastropoda
- Subclass: Caenogastropoda
- Order: Littorinimorpha
- Superfamily: Rissooidea
- Family: Rissoidae
- Genus: Alvania
- Species: A. asperula

Binomial name
- Alvania asperula (Brugnone, 1880)

Synonyms
- Alvania montagui var. asperula (Brugnone, 1880); Rissoa (Alvania) asperula Brugnone, 1880 superseded combination

= Alvania asperula =

Species of gastropod

Alvania asperula is a species of small sea snail, a marine gastropod mollusk or micromollusk in the family Rissoidae.

== Description ==
The length of the shell attains 4 mm, its width 2 ¼ mm.

(Original description in Italian) The shell is oval, ventricose, and somewhat acute. It consists of 7-8 convex whorls separated by deep, broad sutures. The first three whorls are smooth and embryonic, while the remaining whorls are marked by longitudinal ribs and transverse bands. Approximately 12 straight, slender ribs appear on the fourth whorl, gradually thickening or thinning before abruptly vanishing at the base. The body whorl bears 8-10 spiral bands or raised lines, while the penultimate whorl has 3–4, with both sets crossing the ribs and becoming granular at the intersections. The aperture is ovate-round, oblique, and slightly pointed at the top; the outer lip is thickened externally and grooved internally, while the inner lip is thin.

== Distribution ==
The holotype of this marine species was found as a fossil in Pliocene strata near Caltanisetta, Sicily, Italy.
