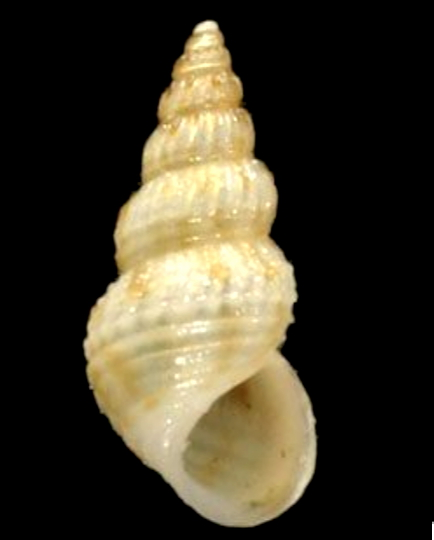
- Shell of Alvania rudis (specimen at the Natural History Museum, Rotterdam)

Scientific classification
- Kingdom: Animalia
- Phylum: Mollusca
- Class: Gastropoda
- Subclass: Caenogastropoda
- Order: Littorinimorpha
- Superfamily: Rissooidea
- Family: Rissoidae
- Genus: Alvania
- Species: A. rudis

Binomial name
- Alvania rudis (Philippi, 1844)

Synonyms
- Alvania rudis hyperrudis Oberling, 1970; Rissoa rudis R. A. Philippi, 1844 superseded combination; Turboella (Thapsiella) rudis (R. A. Philippi, 1844) superseded combination

= Alvania rudis =

Species of mollusc

Alvania rudis is a species of small sea snail, a marine gastropod mollusc or micromollusk in the family Rissoidae.

== Description ==
The length of the shell attains 3.8 mm.

== Distribution ==
This species occurs in the Mediterranean Sea off Sicily and Greece.
