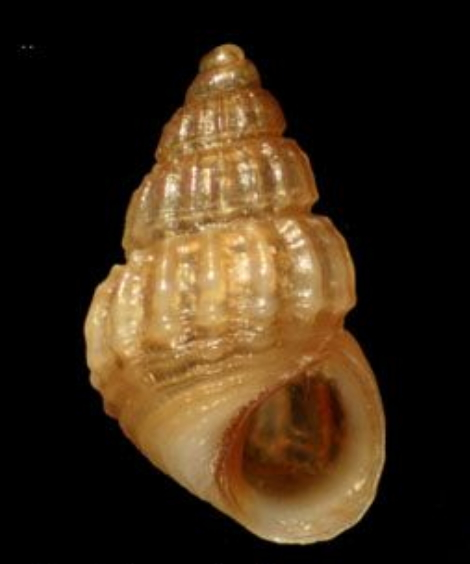
- Shell of Alvania bozcaadensis (specimen at the Natural History Museum, Rotterdam)

Scientific classification
- Kingdom: Animalia
- Phylum: Mollusca
- Class: Gastropoda
- Subclass: Caenogastropoda
- Order: Littorinimorpha
- Superfamily: Rissooidea
- Family: Rissoidae
- Genus: Alvania
- Species: A. bozcaadensis

Binomial name
- Alvania bozcaadensis Tisselli & Giunchi, 2013

= Alvania bozcaadensis =

Species of gastropod

Alvania bozcaadensis is a species of small sea snail, a marine gastropod mollusk or micromollusk in the family Rissoidae.

== Description ==
The length of the shell attains 2.4 mm.

== Distribution ==
This marine species occurs in the Mediterranean Sea off the coast of Turkey and Greece.
