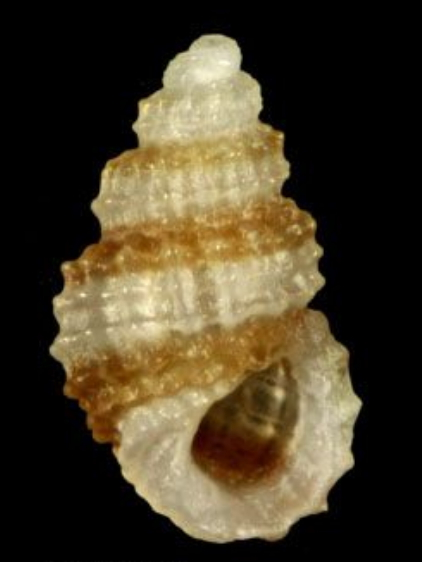
- Shell of Alvania amatii (specimen at the Natural History Museum, Rotterdam)

Scientific classification
- Kingdom: Animalia
- Phylum: Mollusca
- Class: Gastropoda
- Subclass: Caenogastropoda
- Order: Littorinimorpha
- Superfamily: Rissooidea
- Family: Rissoidae
- Genus: Alvania
- Species: A. amatii

Binomial name
- Alvania amatii Oliverio, 1986

= Alvania amatii =

Species of gastropod

Alvania amatii is a species of small sea snail, a marine gastropod mollusk or micromollusk in the family Rissoidae.

== Description ==
The length of the shell varies between 1.5 mm and 3 mm.

The shell has characterized by a paucispiral protoconch with five spiral threads.

== Distribution ==
This marine species occurs in the Mediterranean Sea off Corsica, France and off Turkey.
