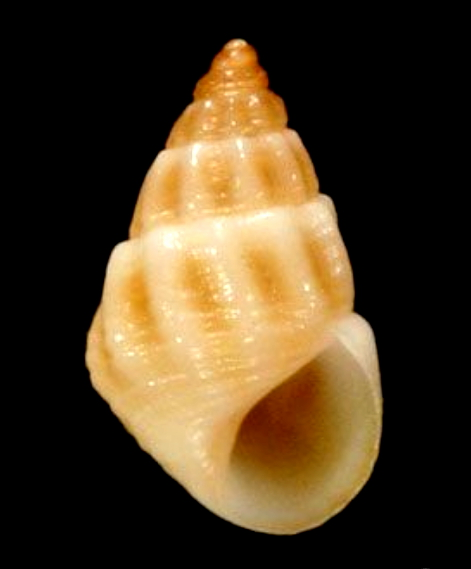
- Shell of Alvania settepassii (specimen at the Natural History Museum, Rotterdam)

Scientific classification
- Kingdom: Animalia
- Phylum: Mollusca
- Class: Gastropoda
- Subclass: Caenogastropoda
- Order: Littorinimorpha
- Family: Rissoidae
- Genus: Alvania
- Species: A. settepassii

Binomial name
- Alvania settepassii Amati & Nofroni, 1985

= Alvania settepassii =

Species of gastropod

Alvania settepassii is a species of small sea snail, a marine gastropod mollusk or micromollusk in the family Rissoidae.

== Description ==
The length of the shell varies between 3.5 mm and 5 mm.

== Distribution ==
This species occurs in the Central Mediterranean Sea off Corsica; in the Aegean Sea off Greece.
