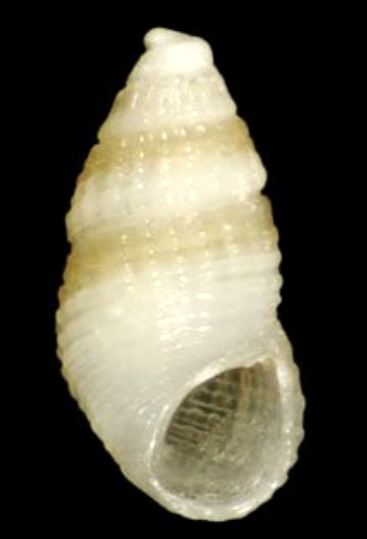
- Shell of Alvania meridioamericana (specimen at the Natural History Museum, Rotterdam)

Scientific classification
- Kingdom: Animalia
- Phylum: Mollusca
- Class: Gastropoda
- Subclass: Caenogastropoda
- Order: Littorinimorpha
- Family: Rissoidae
- Genus: Alvania
- Species: A. meridioamericana

Binomial name
- Alvania meridioamericana Weisbord, 1962

= Alvania meridioamericana =

Species of gastropod

Alvania meridioamericana is a species of small sea snail, a marine gastropod mollusk or micromollusk in the family Rissoidae.

== Taxonomy ==
This is a Lirobarleeia (Barleeidae); possibly a junior synonym of Lirobarleeia chiriquiensis (Olsson & McGinty, 1958).

== Description ==
The length of the shell attains 2.5 mm.

== Distribution ==
This species occurs in the Caribbean Sea off Curaçao and Venezuela.
