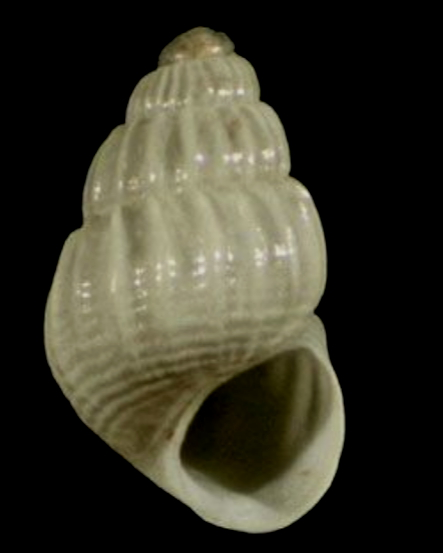
- Shell of Alvania microstriata (specimen at the Natural History Museum, Rotterdam)

Scientific classification
- Kingdom: Animalia
- Phylum: Mollusca
- Class: Gastropoda
- Subclass: Caenogastropoda
- Order: Littorinimorpha
- Superfamily: Rissooidea
- Family: Rissoidae
- Genus: Alvania
- Species: A. microstriata

Binomial name
- Alvania microstriata (Hoenselaar & Goud, 1998)

= Alvania microstriata =

Species of gastropod

Alvania microstriata is a species of minute sea snail, a marine gastropod mollusk or micromollusk in the family Rissoidae.

== Description ==
The length of the shell varies between 1.4 mm and 2 mm.

== Distribution ==
This species occurs in the Atlantic Ocean off Madeira.
