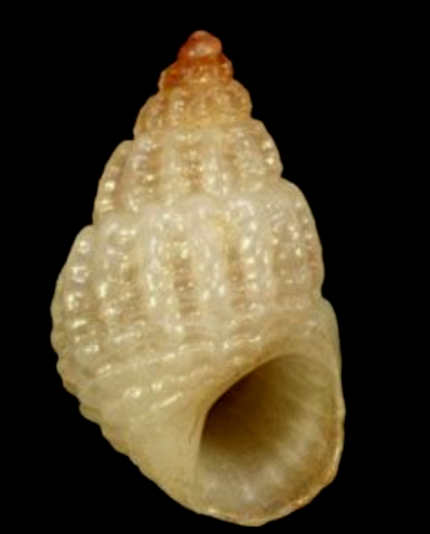
- Shell of Alvania elisae (specimen at the Natural History Museum, Rotterdam)

Scientific classification
- Kingdom: Animalia
- Phylum: Mollusca
- Class: Gastropoda
- Subclass: Caenogastropoda
- Order: Littorinimorpha
- Family: Rissoidae
- Genus: Alvania
- Species: A. elisae

Binomial name
- Alvania elisae Margelli, 2001

= Alvania elisae =

Species of gastropod

Alvania elisae is a species of minute sea snail, a marine gastropod mollusk or micromollusk in the family Rissoidae. They are Surficial Modifiers and Detritivores.

== Description ==
The length of the shell attains 3.8 mm.

== Distribution ==
This species occurs in the Mediterranean Sea off Greece and Naples, Italy.
