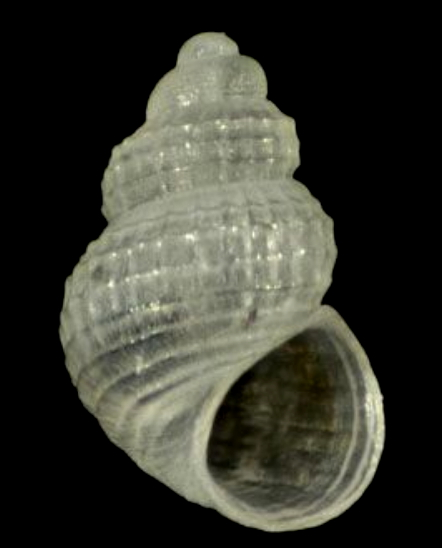
- Shell of Alvania josefoi (specimen at the Natural History Museum, Rotterdam)

Scientific classification
- Kingdom: Animalia
- Phylum: Mollusca
- Class: Gastropoda
- Subclass: Caenogastropoda
- Order: Littorinimorpha
- Family: Rissoidae
- Genus: Alvania
- Species: A. josefoi

Binomial name
- Alvania josefoi Oliver & Templado, 2009

= Alvania josefoi =

Species of gastropod

Alvania josefoi is a species of small sea snail, a marine gastropod mollusk or micromollusk in the family Rissoidae.

== Description ==
The length of the shell attains 1.8 mm.

== Distribution ==
This species occurs in the Mediterranean Sea off the Balearic Islands and Greece.
