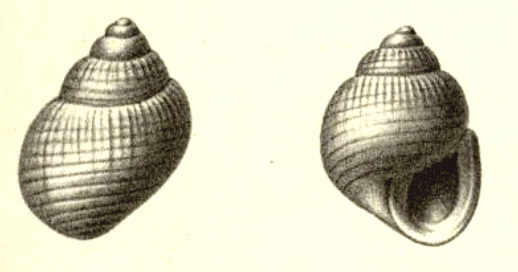
- Shell of Alvania beyrichii (holotype)

Scientific classification
- Kingdom: Animalia
- Phylum: Mollusca
- Class: Gastropoda
- Subclass: Caenogastropoda
- Order: Littorinimorpha
- Superfamily: Rissooidea
- Family: Rissoidae
- Genus: Alvania
- Species: †A. beyrichii

Binomial name
- †Alvania beyrichii (Bosquet, 1859)

Synonyms
- † Rissoa beyrichii Bosquet, 1859 (basionym; does not belong to Rissoa)

= Alvania beyrichii =

Species of gastropod

Alvania beyrichii is an extinct species of minute sea snail, a marine gastropod mollusc or micromollusk in the family Rissoidae.

== Description ==
The length of the shell attains 1.6 mm, its diameter 1.2 mm.

Their functional type is Benthos.

Their feeding type was a grazer and also a detritus feeder.

== Distribution ==
Fossils of this species were found in Lower Oligocene strata in Belgium.
