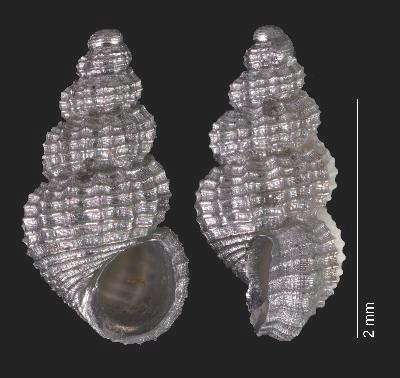
- Shell of Alvania coseli (holotype at MNHN, Paris)

Scientific classification
- Kingdom: Animalia
- Phylum: Mollusca
- Class: Gastropoda
- Subclass: Caenogastropoda
- Order: Littorinimorpha
- Family: Rissoidae
- Genus: Alvania
- Species: A. coseli

Binomial name
- Alvania coseli (Gofas, 1999)

= Alvania coseli =

Species of gastropod

Alvania coseli is a species of minute sea snail, a marine gastropod mollusk or micromollusk in the family Rissoidae.

== Etymology ==
Alvania coseli is named after Rudo von Cosel, because of his contributions to malacology in West Africa.

== Description ==
The average length of the shell is 2.75 millimetres (0.108 in), and its shape is minute and conical.

== Distribution ==
This marine species occurs off the coast of Dakar, Senegal at depths of 80 to 250 metres (260 to 820 ft).
