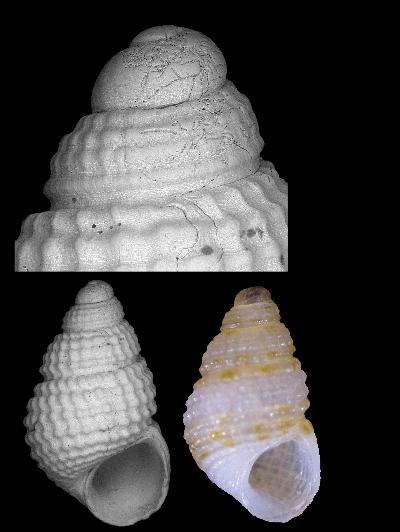
- Shell of Alvania albachiarae (holotype at MNHN, Paris)

Scientific classification
- Kingdom: Animalia
- Phylum: Mollusca
- Class: Gastropoda
- Subclass: Caenogastropoda
- Order: Littorinimorpha
- Superfamily: Rissooidea
- Family: Rissoidae
- Genus: Alvania
- Species: A. albachiarae

Binomial name
- Alvania albachiarae Perugia, 2021

= Alvania albachiarae =

Species of gastropod

Alvania albachiarae is a species of minute sea snail, a marine gastropod mollusk or micromollusk in the family Rissoidae.

== Distribution ==
This marine species occurs off Oman.
