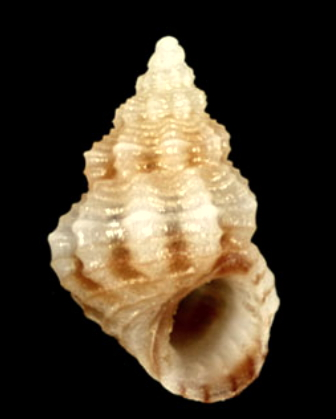
- Shell of Alvania colossophilus (specimen at the Natural History Museum, Rotterdam)

Scientific classification
- Kingdom: Animalia
- Phylum: Mollusca
- Class: Gastropoda
- Subclass: Caenogastropoda
- Order: Littorinimorpha
- Superfamily: Rissooidea
- Family: Rissoidae
- Genus: Alvania
- Species: A. colossophilus

Binomial name
- Alvania colossophilus Oberling, 1970

Synonyms
- Alvania karpathoensis F. Nordsieck, 1972

= Alvania colossophilus =

Species of gastropod

Alvania colossophilus is a species of minute sea snail, a marine gastropod mollusk or micromollusk in the family Rissoidae.

== Description ==
The length of the shell attains 3.7 mm, its diameter is 2.2 mm.

== Distribution ==
This species occurs in the Eastern Mediterranean Sea, in the Aegean Sea and off the Turkish coast.
