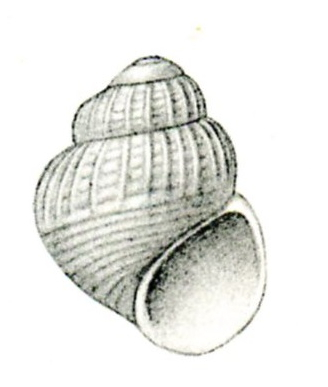
- Drawing of a shell of Alvania nicobarica (holotype)

Scientific classification
- Kingdom: Animalia
- Phylum: Mollusca
- Class: Gastropoda
- Subclass: Caenogastropoda
- Order: Littorinimorpha
- Superfamily: Rissooidea
- Family: Rissoidae
- Genus: Alvania
- Species: A. beyersi

Binomial name
- Alvania beyersi (Thiele, 1925)

Synonyms
- Alvania (Linemera) nicobarica (Thiele, 1925) · alternate representation; Rissoa (Alvania) nicobarica Thiele, 1925 (basionym); Rissoa nicobarica Thiele, 1925 (original combination)

= Alvania nicobarica =

Species of gastropod

Alvania nicobarica is a species of minute sea snail, a marine gastropod mollusk or micromollusk in the family Rissoidae.

== Distribution ==
This marine species occurs in the Indian Ocean off the Nicobar Islands
