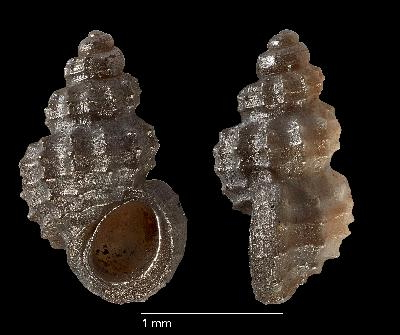
- Shell of Alvania gofasi (holotype at MNHN, Paris)

Scientific classification
- Kingdom: Animalia
- Phylum: Mollusca
- Class: Gastropoda
- Subclass: Caenogastropoda
- Order: Littorinimorpha
- Superfamily: Rissooidea
- Family: Rissoidae
- Genus: Alvania
- Species: A. gofasi

Binomial name
- Alvania gofasi (Rolán & F. Fernandes, 1990)

Synonyms
- Manzonia gofasi Rolán & F. Fernandes, 1990 (original combination)

= Alvania gofasi =

Species of sea snail

Alvania gofasi is a species of small sea snail, a marine gastropod mollusk or micromollusk in the family Rissoidae.

== Description ==
The length of the shell varies between 1.7 mm and 2.4 mm.

== Distribution ==
This species occurs in the Atlantic Ocean off Angola.
