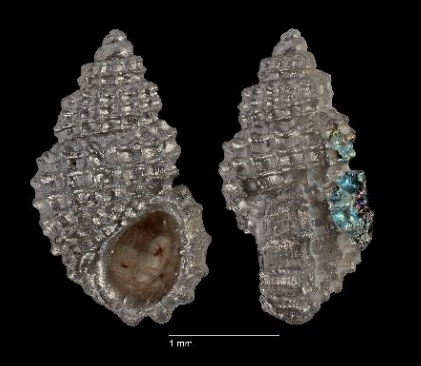
- Shell of Alvania marioi (holotype at MNHN, Paris)

Scientific classification
- Kingdom: Animalia
- Phylum: Mollusca
- Class: Gastropoda
- Subclass: Caenogastropoda
- Order: Littorinimorpha
- Superfamily: Rissooidea
- Family: Rissoidae
- Genus: Alvania
- Species: A. marioi

Binomial name
- Alvania marioi Gofas, 1999

= Alvania marioi =

Species of gastropod

Alvania marioi is a species of minute sea snail, a marine gastropod mollusk or micromollusk in the family Rissoidae.

== Description ==
The length of the shell attains 2.75 mm.

== Distribution ==
This species occurs in the Atlantic Ocean off Angola.
