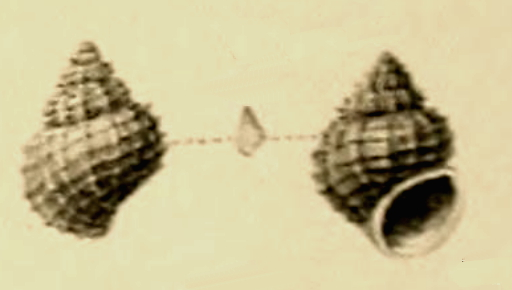
- Shell of Alvania ampulla (holotype)

Scientific classification
- Kingdom: Animalia
- Phylum: Mollusca
- Class: Gastropoda
- Subclass: Caenogastropoda
- Order: Littorinimorpha
- Superfamily: Rissooidea
- Family: Rissoidae
- Genus: Alvania
- Species: †A. ampulla

Binomial name
- †Alvania ampulla (Eichwald, 1853)

Synonyms
- † Rissoa ampulla Eichwald, 1853

= Alvania ampulla =

Species of gastropod

Alvania ampulla is an extinct species of minute sea snail, a marine gastropod mollusc or micromollusk in the family Rissoidae.

== Distribution ==
Fossils of this marine species were found in Romania.
