= Alvania canonica =

Scientific classification
- Kingdom: Animalia
- Phylum: Mollusca
- Class: Gastropoda
- Subclass: Caenogastropoda
- Order: Littorinimorpha
- Superfamily: Rissooidea
- Family: Rissoidae
- Genus: Alvania
- Species: A. canonica

Binomial name
- Alvania canonica (Dall, 1927)

Synonyms
- Rissoa (Cingula) canonica Dall, 1927 (basionym); Rissoa canonica Dall, 1927 (Alvania accepted as genus)

Species of gastropod

Alvania canonica is a species of minute sea snail, a marine gastropod mollusk or micromollusk in the family Rissoidae.

== Description ==
The length of the shell attains 2.5 mm, its diameter 1.4 mm.

(Original description) The small, white shell is smooth and opaque. It has four well-rounded whorls, including a smooth, not differentiated, protoconch and separated by a well-marked but not deep suture. The sculpture only consists of more or less feeble incremental lines. The base of the shell is evenly rounded and imperforate. The aperture is subovate, not oblique. The margin is simple, slightly thickened, not complete in the young but in the adult united by enamel over the body

== Distribution ==
This marine species occurs in the Atlantic Ocean off Georgia, USA.
