= Alvania awa =

Scientific classification
- Kingdom: Animalia
- Phylum: Mollusca
- Class: Gastropoda
- Subclass: Caenogastropoda
- Order: Littorinimorpha
- Superfamily: Rissooidea
- Family: Rissoidae
- Genus: Alvania
- Species: A. awa

Binomial name
- Alvania awa Chinzei, 1959

Species of gastropod

Alvania awa is a species of minute sea snail, a marine gastropod mollusk or micromollusk in the family Rissoidae.

== Distribution ==
This marine species occurs in the Sea of Japan.

== Bibliography ==
- Chinzei, K. (1959) Molluscan fauna of the Pliocene Sannohe Group of northeast Honshu, Japan. 1. The faunule of the Kubo Formation. Journal of the Faculty of Science, University of Tokyo, section 2, 12, 103–132, pls. 9–11.
- Hasegawa K. (2014) A review of bathyal Rissoidae in the Sea of Japan and adjacent waters (Gastropoda: Rissooidea). In: T. Fujita (ed.), Deep-sea fauna of the Sea of Japan. National Museum of Nature and Science Monographs 44: 75–148.
