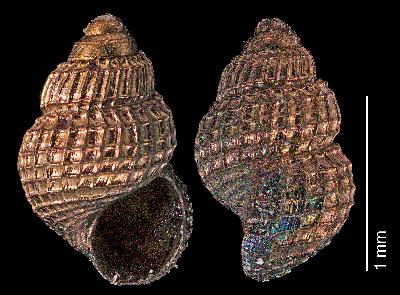
- Shell of Alvania flexilis (holotype at MNHN, Paris)

Scientific classification
- Kingdom: Animalia
- Phylum: Mollusca
- Class: Gastropoda
- Subclass: Caenogastropoda
- Order: Littorinimorpha
- Family: Rissoidae
- Genus: Alvania
- Species: A. flexilis

Binomial name
- Alvania flexilis Gofas, 1999

= Alvania flexilis =

Species of gastropod

Alvania flexilis is a species of minute sea snail, a marine gastropod mollusk or micromollusk in the family Rissoidae.

== Description ==
The length of the shell attains 1.06 mm.

== Distribution ==
This marine species occurs off Angola.
