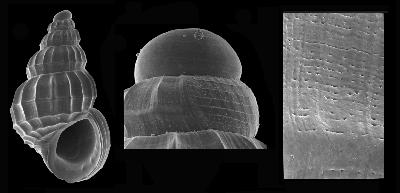
- Shell of Alvania hyerensis (holotype at MNHN, Paris)

Scientific classification
- Kingdom: Animalia
- Phylum: Mollusca
- Class: Gastropoda
- Subclass: Caenogastropoda
- Order: Littorinimorpha
- Family: Rissoidae
- Genus: Alvania
- Species: A. hyerensis

Binomial name
- Alvania hyerensis Gofas, 2007

= Alvania hyerensis =

Species of gastropod

Alvania hyerensis is a species of minute sea snail, a marine gastropod mollusc or micromollusc in the family Rissoidae.

== Description ==
The length of the shell attains 3.04 mm.

== Distribution ==
This marine species occurs in the Atlantic Ocean and is endemic on the Hyères seamount, very common in 310–750 m.
