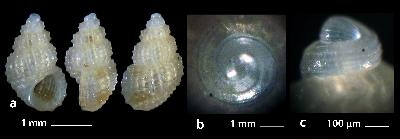
- Shell of Alvania esmes (holotype at MNHN, Paris)

Scientific classification
- Kingdom: Animalia
- Phylum: Mollusca
- Class: Gastropoda
- Subclass: Caenogastropoda
- Order: Littorinimorpha
- Superfamily: Rissooidea
- Family: Rissoidae
- Genus: Alvania
- Species: A. esmes

Binomial name
- Alvania esmes Manousis, J. D. Oliver & Zaminos, 2023

= Alvania esmes =

Species of gastropod

Alvania esmes is a species of small sea snail, a marine gastropod mollusk or micromollusk in the family Rissoidae.

== Description ==
The length of the shell attains 2.4 mm.

== Distribution ==
This species occurs in the Eastern Mediterranean Sea off Greece and in the Aegean Sea.
