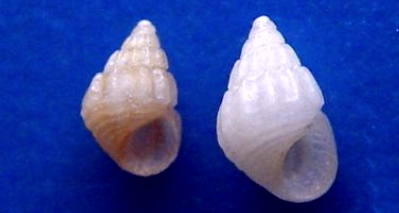
- Shell of Alvania zaraensis

Scientific classification
- Kingdom: Animalia
- Phylum: Mollusca
- Class: Gastropoda
- Subclass: Caenogastropoda
- Order: Littorinimorpha
- Superfamily: Rissooidea
- Family: Rissoidae
- Genus: Alvania
- Species: A. zaraensis

Binomial name
- Alvania zaraensis Amati & Appolloni, 2019

= Alvania zaraensis =

Species of gastropod

Alvania zaraensis is a species of small sea snail, a marine gastropod mollusk or micromollusk in the family Rissoidae.

== Distribution ==
This species occurs in the Mediterranean Sea.
