= Alvania mariae =

Scientific classification
- Kingdom: Animalia
- Phylum: Mollusca
- Class: Gastropoda
- Subclass: Caenogastropoda
- Order: Littorinimorpha
- Superfamily: Rissooidea
- Family: Rissoidae
- Genus: Alvania
- Species: †A. mariae

Binomial name
- †Alvania mariae (A. d'Orbigny, 1852)

Synonyms
- † Alvania (Acinus) mariae (A. d'Orbigny, 1852) (unaccepted subgenus); † Alvania (Turbona) mariae (A. d'Orbigny, 1852) (unaccepted subgenus); † Rissoa mariae A. d'Orbigny, 1852 superseded combination

Species of gastropod

Alvania mariae is an extinct species of minute sea snail, a marine gastropod mollusc or micromollusk in the family Rissoidae.

== Distribution ==
Fossils of this species were in Miocene strata in the Landes, France.
