= Alvania seguenzorum =

Scientific classification
- Kingdom: Animalia
- Phylum: Mollusca
- Class: Gastropoda
- Subclass: Caenogastropoda
- Order: Littorinimorpha
- Superfamily: Rissooidea
- Family: Rissoidae
- Genus: Alvania
- Species: †A. seguenzorum

Binomial name
- †Alvania seguenzorum Bertolaso & Palazzi, 2000

Synonyms
- † Alvania solidula (G. Seguenza, 1876); † Rissoa (Alvania) solidula G. Seguenza, 1876 junior homonym (Junior primary homonym); † Rissoa solidula G. Seguenza, 1876

Species of gastropod

Alvania seguenzorum is an extinct species of minute sea snail, a marine gastropod mollusk or micromollusk in the family Rissoidae.

== Nomenclature ==
Replacement name for Rissoa solidula Seguenza, 1876, non Philippi, 1848
