= Alvania montensis =

Scientific classification
- Kingdom: Animalia
- Phylum: Mollusca
- Class: Gastropoda
- Subclass: Caenogastropoda
- Order: Littorinimorpha
- Superfamily: Rissooidea
- Family: Rissoidae
- Genus: Alvania
- Species: †A. montensis

Binomial name
- †Alvania montensis Glibert, 1973

Synonyms
- † Alvania (Arsenia) montensis Glibert, 1973 (basionym; Arsenia is a junior synonym of Alvania)

Species of gastropod

Alvania montensis is an extinct species of minute sea snail, a marine gastropod mollusc or micromollusk in the family Rissoidae.

== Description ==
The length of the shell attains 2.2 mm (0.087 in), its diameter 1.25 mm (0.049 in).

== Distribution ==
Fossils of this marine species were found in Montian (Paleocene) strata near Mons, Belgium.
