= Alvania kenneyi =

Scientific classification
- Kingdom: Animalia
- Phylum: Mollusca
- Class: Gastropoda
- Subclass: Caenogastropoda
- Order: Littorinimorpha
- Superfamily: Rissooidea
- Family: Rissoidae
- Genus: Alvania
- Species: †A. kenneyi

Binomial name
- †Alvania kenneyi Ladd, 1966

Synonyms
- † Alvania (Taramellia) kenneyi Ladd, 1966; † Merelina kenneyi (Ladd, 1966)

Species of gastropod

Alvania kenneyi is an extinct species of minute sea snail, a marine gastropod mollusc or micromollusk in the family Rissoidae.

== Description ==
The length of the shell attains 0.8 mm, its diameter 0.5 mm.

== Distribution ==
Fossils of this marine species were found in Miocene strata at Enewetak Atoll, Marshall Islands.
