= Alvania craticula =

Scientific classification
- Kingdom: Animalia
- Phylum: Mollusca
- Class: Gastropoda
- Subclass: Caenogastropoda
- Order: Littorinimorpha
- Superfamily: Rissooidea
- Family: Rissoidae
- Genus: Alvania
- Species: †A. craticula

Binomial name
- †Alvania craticula (Briart & Cornet, 1887)

Synonyms
- † Alvania (Arsenia) craticula Briart & Cornet, 1887 (basionym; Arsenia is a junior synonym of Alvania); † Rissoa craticula Briart & Cornet, 1887 (Alvania accepted as full genus)

Species of gastropod

Alvania craticula is an extinct species of minute sea snail, a marine gastropod mollusk or micromollusk in the family Rissoidae.

== Distribution ==
Fossils were found in the Danian strata (Paleocene) near Mons, Belgium.
