= Alvania obliquicostata =

Scientific classification
- Kingdom: Animalia
- Phylum: Mollusca
- Class: Gastropoda
- Subclass: Caenogastropoda
- Order: Littorinimorpha
- Superfamily: Rissooidea
- Family: Rissoidae
- Genus: Alvania
- Species: †A. obliquicostata

Binomial name
- †Alvania obliquicostata H. Wang, 1981

Synonyms
- † Alvania (Acinulus) obliquicostatus H.-J. Wang, 1981 (superseded combination); † Alvania obliquicostatus H. Wang, 1981 (wrong gender agreement of specific epithet)

Species of gastropod

Alvania obliquicostata is an extinct species of minute sea snail, a marine gastropod mollusc or micromollusk in the family Rissoidae.

== Distribution ==
Fossils of this species were found in Tertiary strata in the continental shelf of the South China Sea
