= Alvania basisulcata =

Scientific classification
- Kingdom: Animalia
- Phylum: Mollusca
- Class: Gastropoda
- Subclass: Caenogastropoda
- Order: Littorinimorpha
- Superfamily: Rissooidea
- Family: Rissoidae
- Genus: Alvania
- Species: †A. basisulcata

Binomial name
- †Alvania basisulcata A. W. Janssen, 1972

Synonyms
- Alvania (Actonia) basisulcata A. W. Janssen, 1972

Species of gastropod

Alvania basisulcata is an extinct species of minute sea snail, a marine gastropod mollusc or micromollusk in the family Rissoidae.

== Description ==
The length of the shell attains 2.4 mm, its diameter is 1.6 mm.

== Distribution ==
Fossils of this species were found in late Miocene strata in Northern Germany.
