= Alvania joseae =

Scientific classification
- Kingdom: Animalia
- Phylum: Mollusca
- Class: Gastropoda
- Subclass: Caenogastropoda
- Order: Littorinimorpha
- Family: Rissoidae
- Genus: Alvania
- Species: A. joseae

Binomial name
- Alvania joseae (Hoenselaar & Goud, 1998)

Species of gastropod

Alvania joseae is a species of minute sea snail, a marine gastropod mollusk or micromollusk in the family Rissoidae.

== Description ==
The length of the shell attains 2.8 mm. Their shells are pale, "ovate to cylindrical, with a blunt apex." The shell displays 1.5 whorls, often with light brown bands or spots. They are heterotrophs, specifically detritivores.

== Distribution ==
This species occurs in the Atlantic Ocean off the Canary Islands.
