= Alvania productilis =

Scientific classification
- Kingdom: Animalia
- Phylum: Mollusca
- Class: Gastropoda
- Subclass: Caenogastropoda
- Order: Littorinimorpha
- Superfamily: Rissooidea
- Family: Rissoidae
- Genus: Alvania
- Species: †A. productilis

Binomial name
- †Alvania productilis O. Boettger, 1907

Synonyms
- † Alvania (Alvania) productilis O. Boettger, 1907

Species of gastropod

Alvania productilis is an extinct species of minute sea snail, a marine gastropod mollusc or micromollusk in the family Rissoidae.

== Description ==
The length of the shell attains 2 1/8 mm, its diameter 1 1/4 mm.

== Distribution ==
Fossils of this marine species have been found in Middle Miocene strata in Romania and Turkey.
