= Alvania angusticostata =

Scientific classification
- Kingdom: Animalia
- Phylum: Mollusca
- Class: Gastropoda
- Subclass: Caenogastropoda
- Order: Littorinimorpha
- Superfamily: Rissooidea
- Family: Rissoidae
- Genus: Alvania
- Species: †A. angusticostata

Binomial name
- †Alvania angusticostata Traub, 1981

Synonyms
- mall>

Species of gastropod

Alvania angusticostata is an extinct species of minute sea snail, a marine gastropod mollusc or micromollusk in the family Rissoidae.

== Homonymy ==
Rissoa angusticostata Sandberger, 1860 is most probably an Alvania too as Alvania angusticostata Sandberger, 1860 with fossils of this marine species found in Oligocene strata in Rhineland-Palatinate, Germany.
