= Alvania abstersa =

Scientific classification
- Kingdom: Animalia
- Phylum: Mollusca
- Class: Gastropoda
- Subclass: Caenogastropoda
- Order: Littorinimorpha
- Superfamily: Rissooidea
- Family: Rissoidae
- Genus: Alvania
- Species: A. abstersa

Binomial name
- Alvania abstersa van der Linden & van Aartsen, 1993

Synonyms
- Alvania obsoleta van der Linden, 1993 (Invalid: junior secondary homonym of Alvania obsoleta (S.V. Wood, 1848); Alvania abstersa is a replacement name)

Species of gastropod

Alvania abstersa is a species of small sea snail, a marine gastropod mollusk or micromollusk in the family Rissoidae.

== Distribution ==
This marine species occurs off the Azores.
