= Alvania tongrorum =

Scientific classification
- Kingdom: Animalia
- Phylum: Mollusca
- Class: Gastropoda
- Subclass: Caenogastropoda
- Order: Littorinimorpha
- Superfamily: Rissooidea
- Family: Rissoidae
- Genus: Alvania
- Species: †A. tongrorum

Binomial name
- †Alvania tongrorum Glibert & de Heinzelin de Braucourt, 1954

Synonyms
- † Alvania (Arsenia) tongrorum Glibert & de Heinzelin de Braucourt, 1954

Species of gastropod

Alvania tongrorum is an extinct species of minute sea snail, a marine gastropod mollusc or micromollusk in the family Rissoidae.

== Distribution ==
Fossils of this species were in Oligocene strata near Lattorf, Germany.
