= Alvania herwigia =

Scientific classification
- Kingdom: Animalia
- Phylum: Mollusca
- Class: Gastropoda
- Subclass: Caenogastropoda
- Order: Littorinimorpha
- Superfamily: Rissooidea
- Family: Rissoidae
- Genus: Alvania
- Species: A. herwigia

Binomial name
- Alvania herwigia (Castellanos & D. E. Fernández, 1974)

Synonyms
- Rissoa herwigia Castellanos & D. E. Fernández, 1974

Species of gastropod

Alvania herwigia is a species of minute sea snail, a marine gastropod mollusk or micromollusk in the family Rissoidae.

== Description ==
The length of the shell attains 1 mm.

== Distribution ==
This species occurs in the Atlantic Ocean off Uruguay.
