= Alvania sublaevigata =

Scientific classification
- Kingdom: Animalia
- Phylum: Mollusca
- Class: Gastropoda
- Subclass: Caenogastropoda
- Order: Littorinimorpha
- Superfamily: Rissooidea
- Family: Rissoidae
- Genus: Alvania
- Species: †A. sublaevigata

Binomial name
- †Alvania sublaevigata O. Boettger, 1907

Synonyms
- mall>

Species of gastropod

Alvania sublaevigata is an extinct species of minute sea snail, a marine gastropod mollusc or micromollusk in the family Rissoidae.

== Description ==
The length of the shell attains 2.5 mm, its diameter is 1.25 mm.

== Distribution ==
Fossils of this marine species were found in Middle Miocene strata in Romania.
