= Alvania akibai =

Scientific classification
- Kingdom: Animalia
- Phylum: Mollusca
- Class: Gastropoda
- Subclass: Caenogastropoda
- Order: Littorinimorpha
- Superfamily: Rissooidea
- Family: Rissoidae
- Genus: Alvania
- Species: A. akibai

Binomial name
- Alvania akibai (Yokoyama, 1926)

Synonyms
- † Rissoa (Alvania) akibai Yokoyama, 1926 (original combination)

Species of gastropod

Alvania akibai is a species of small sea snail, a marine gastropod mollusk or micromollusk in the family Rissoidae.

== Description ==
The length of the shell attains 3 mm, its diameter is 2.3 mm.

== Distribution ==
This species occurs in the Sea of Japan.
