= Alvania aturensis =

Scientific classification
- Kingdom: Animalia
- Phylum: Mollusca
- Class: Gastropoda
- Subclass: Caenogastropoda
- Order: Littorinimorpha
- Superfamily: Rissooidea
- Family: Rissoidae
- Genus: Alvania
- Species: †A. aturensis

Binomial name
- †Alvania aturensis Lozouet, 1998

Species of gastropod

Alvania aturensis is an extinct species of minute sea snail, a marine gastropod mollusc or micromollusk in the family Rissoidae.

== Description ==
The length of the shell attains 2.4 mm, its diameter 1.5 mm.

== Distribution ==
Fossils of this species were found in Oligocene strata in the Landes, France (age range: 23.03 to 15.97 Ma).
