= Alvania praenovarensis =

Scientific classification
- Kingdom: Animalia
- Phylum: Mollusca
- Class: Gastropoda
- Subclass: Caenogastropoda
- Order: Littorinimorpha
- Superfamily: Rissooidea
- Family: Rissoidae
- Genus: Alvania
- Species: †A. praenovarensis

Binomial name
- †Alvania praenovarensis (Ludbrook, 1956)

Synonyms
- † Turboella praenovarensis Ludbrook, 1956

Extinct species of gastropod

Alvania praenovarensis is an extinct species of minute sea snail, a marine gastropod mollusk or micromollusk in the family Rissoidae.

== Distribution ==
Fossils have been found in Upper Pliocene strata off Adelaide, Australia.
