= Alvania convexispira =

Scientific classification
- Kingdom: Animalia
- Phylum: Mollusca
- Class: Gastropoda
- Subclass: Caenogastropoda
- Order: Littorinimorpha
- Superfamily: Rissooidea
- Family: Rissoidae
- Genus: Alvania
- Species: †A. convexispira

Binomial name
- †Alvania convexispira O. Boettger, 1907

Species of gastropod

Alvania convexispira is an extinct species of minute sea snail, a marine gastropod mollusc or micromollusk in the family Rissoidae.

== Description ==
The length of the shell attains 2.5 mm, and its diameter is 1.5 mm.

== Distribution ==
Fossils of this marine species were found in Middle Miocene strata in Hungary.
