= Alvania planicincta =

Scientific classification
- Kingdom: Animalia
- Phylum: Mollusca
- Class: Gastropoda
- Subclass: Caenogastropoda
- Order: Littorinimorpha
- Superfamily: Rissooidea
- Family: Rissoidae
- Genus: Alvania
- Species: †A. planicincta

Binomial name
- †Alvania planicincta (Le Renard, 1990)

Synonyms
- † Alvinia planicincta Le Renard, 1990 superseded combination

Species of gastropod

Alvania planicincta is an extinct species of minute sea snail, a marine gastropod mollusc or micromollusk in the family Rissoidae.

== Distribution ==
Fossils of this species were found in Eocene strata in Île-de-France, France
