= Alvania partschi =

Scientific classification
- Kingdom: Animalia
- Phylum: Mollusca
- Class: Gastropoda
- Subclass: Caenogastropoda
- Order: Littorinimorpha
- Superfamily: Rissooidea
- Family: Rissoidae
- Genus: Alvania
- Species: †A. partschi

Binomial name
- †Alvania partschi (M. Hörnes, 1856)

Synonyms
- † Rissoa partschi M. Hörnes, 1856

Species of gastropod

Alvania partschi is an extinct species of minute sea snail, a marine gastropod mollusc or micromollusk in the family Rissoidae.

== Distribution ==
Fossils of this species were found in Tertiary strata near Vienna, Austria.
