= Alvania bangkaensis =

Scientific classification
- Kingdom: Animalia
- Phylum: Mollusca
- Class: Gastropoda
- Subclass: Caenogastropoda
- Order: Littorinimorpha
- Family: Rissoidae
- Genus: Alvania
- Species: A. bangkaensis

Binomial name
- Alvania bangkaensis Amati & Perugia, 2026

Species of gastropod

Alvania bangkaensis is a species of small sea snail, a marine gastropod mollusc in the family Rissoidae.

== Description ==
This species is part of a genus that has shell sizes ranging from 1 to 7 mm.

== Distribution ==
This species occurs in the waters between the islands of Borneo and Sulawesi.
