= Alvania granosa =

Scientific classification
- Kingdom: Animalia
- Phylum: Mollusca
- Class: Gastropoda
- Subclass: Caenogastropoda
- Order: Littorinimorpha
- Superfamily: Rissooidea
- Family: Rissoidae
- Genus: Alvania
- Species: †A. granosa

Binomial name
- †Alvania granosa Tabanelli, Bongiardino & Perugia, 2011

Species of gastropod

Alvania granosa is an extinct species of minute sea snail, a marine gastropod mollusc or micromollusk in the family Rissoidae.

== Distribution ==
Fossils of this marine species were found in Miocene strata at the Livornesi Mountains, Italy.
