= Alvania portentosa =

Scientific classification
- Kingdom: Animalia
- Phylum: Mollusca
- Class: Gastropoda
- Subclass: Caenogastropoda
- Order: Littorinimorpha
- Family: Rissoidae
- Genus: Alvania
- Species: A. portentosa

Binomial name
- Alvania portentosa Rolán & Hernández, 2007

Species of gastropod

Alvania portentosa is a species of minute sea snail, a marine gastropod mollusc or micromollusc in the family Rissoidae.

== Description ==
The length of the shell attains 1.8 mm.

== Distribution ==
This species occurs in the Atlantic Ocean off São Tomé and Príncipe.
