= Alvania babylonelliformis =

Scientific classification
- Kingdom: Animalia
- Phylum: Mollusca
- Class: Gastropoda
- Subclass: Caenogastropoda
- Order: Littorinimorpha
- Superfamily: Rissooidea
- Family: Rissoidae
- Genus: Alvania
- Species: †A. babylonelliformis

Binomial name
- †Alvania babylonelliformis Gürs, 1999

Species of gastropod

Alvania babylonelliformis is an extinct species of minute sea snail, a marine gastropod mollusc or micromollusk in the family Rissoidae.

== Distribution ==
Fossils of this species were found in Miocene strata in Northern Germany.
