= Alvania putei =

Scientific classification
- Kingdom: Animalia
- Phylum: Mollusca
- Class: Gastropoda
- Subclass: Caenogastropoda
- Order: Littorinimorpha
- Superfamily: Rissooidea
- Family: Rissoidae
- Genus: Alvania
- Species: †A. putei

Binomial name
- †Alvania putei Lozouet & Maestrati, 1982

Species of gastropod

Alvania putei is an extinct species of minute sea snail, a marine gastropod mollusk or micromollusk in the family Rissoidae.

== Distribution ==
Fossils have been found in Rupelian strata (Oligocene) in Île-de-France, France.
