= Alvania erato =

Scientific classification
- Kingdom: Animalia
- Phylum: Mollusca
- Class: Gastropoda
- Subclass: Caenogastropoda
- Order: Littorinimorpha
- Superfamily: Rissooidea
- Family: Rissoidae
- Genus: Alvania
- Species: †A. erato

Binomial name
- †Alvania erato Chirli & U. Linse, 2011

Species of gastropod

Alvania erato is an extinct species of minute sea snail, a marine gastropod mollusc or micromollusk in the family Rissoidae.

== Distribution ==
Fossils of this species were in the Pleistocene strata in the island Rhodes, Greece.
