= Alvania candasae =

Scientific classification
- Kingdom: Animalia
- Phylum: Mollusca
- Class: Gastropoda
- Subclass: Caenogastropoda
- Order: Littorinimorpha
- Superfamily: Rissooidea
- Family: Rissoidae
- Genus: Alvania
- Species: A. candasae

Binomial name
- Alvania candasae J. D. Oliver & Gofas, 2022

Species of gastropod

Alvania candasae is a species of minute sea snail, a marine gastropod mollusc or micromollusk in the family Rissoidae.

== Distribution ==
This marine species was found in the Muxía Canyon off Western Galicia, Spain.
