= Alvania rischi =

Scientific classification
- Kingdom: Animalia
- Phylum: Mollusca
- Class: Gastropoda
- Subclass: Caenogastropoda
- Order: Littorinimorpha
- Superfamily: Rissooidea
- Family: Rissoidae
- Genus: Alvania
- Species: †A. rischi

Binomial name
- †Alvania rischi Gürs & Weinbrecht, 2001

Species of gastropod

Alvania rischi is an extinct species of minute sea snail, a marine gastropod mollusk or micromollusk in the family Rissoidae.

== Distribution ==
Fossils have been found in Miocene strata in North Germany.
