= Alvania xelae =

Scientific classification
- Kingdom: Animalia
- Phylum: Mollusca
- Class: Gastropoda
- Subclass: Caenogastropoda
- Order: Littorinimorpha
- Superfamily: Rissooidea
- Family: Rissoidae
- Genus: Alvania
- Species: A. xelae

Binomial name
- Alvania xelae J. D. Oliver & Urgorri, 2022

Species of gastropod

Alvania xelae is a species of small sea snail, a marine gastropod mollusk or micromollusk in the family Rissoidae.

== Distribution ==
This marine species occurs off Galicia, Northwest Spain.
