= Alvania wangi =

Scientific classification
- Kingdom: Animalia
- Phylum: Mollusca
- Class: Gastropoda
- Subclass: Caenogastropoda
- Order: Littorinimorpha
- Family: Rissoidae
- Genus: Alvania
- Species: A. wangi

Binomial name
- Alvania wangi B.-Y. Xu, L. Qi & L.-F. Kong, 2022

Species of gastropod

Alvania wangi is a species of small sea snail, a marine gastropod mollusk or micromollusk in the family Rissoidae.

== Distribution ==
This species occurs in the East China Sea.
