= Alvania slieringsi =

Scientific classification
- Kingdom: Animalia
- Phylum: Mollusca
- Class: Gastropoda
- Subclass: Caenogastropoda
- Order: Littorinimorpha
- Family: Rissoidae
- Genus: Alvania
- Species: A. slieringsi

Binomial name
- Alvania slieringsi (Hoenselaar & Goud, 1998)

Species of gastropod

Alvania slieringsi is a species of minute sea snail, a marine gastropod mollusk or micromollusk in the family Rissoidae.

== Distribution ==
Found in European waters, and Canary Island.
