= Alvania gascoignei =

Scientific classification
- Kingdom: Animalia
- Phylum: Mollusca
- Class: Gastropoda
- Subclass: Caenogastropoda
- Order: Littorinimorpha
- Family: Rissoidae
- Genus: Alvania
- Species: A. gascoignei

Binomial name
- Alvania gascoignei Rolán, 2001

Species of gastropod

Alvania gascoignei is a species of small sea snail, a marine gastropod mollusk or micromollusk in the family Rissoidae.

== Distribution ==
This marine species occurs in the Gulf of Guinea, West Africa
