= Alvania varia =

Scientific classification
- Kingdom: Animalia
- Phylum: Mollusca
- Class: Gastropoda
- Subclass: Caenogastropoda
- Order: Littorinimorpha
- Superfamily: Rissooidea
- Family: Rissoidae
- Genus: Alvania
- Species: †A. varia

Binomial name
- †Alvania varia Tabanelli, Bongiardino & Perugia, 2011

Species of gastropod

Alvania varia is an extinct species of minute sea snail, a marine gastropod mollusc or micromollusk in the family Rissoidae.
