= Theba macandrewiana =

Conservation status
- Near Threatened (IUCN 3.1)

Scientific classification
- Kingdom: Animalia
- Phylum: Mollusca
- Class: Gastropoda
- Order: Stylommatophora
- Family: Helicidae
- Genus: Theba
- Species: T. macandrewiana

Binomial name
- Theba macandrewiana (L. Pfeiffer, 1853)

Synonyms
- Helix macandrewiana L. Pfeiffer, 1853; Helix mac-andrewiana L. Pfeiffer, 1853; Helix ustulata R.T. Lowe, 1852; Theba pisana ustulata (Lowe, 1852)

Species of gastropod

Theba macandrewiana is a species of land snail of the family Helicidae, endemic to the Savage Islands of Portugal. Its shell is around 19.4 millimetres (0.76 in) in length.

== Distribution and habitat ==
It is present in the three islands (Selvagem Grande, Selvagem Pequena and Fora Islet) where it occurs on rocky and sandy soils, beneath rocks or associated to grasses from 5 to 160 metres (16 to 525 ft) in altitude. It is the only non-marine gastropod species known from the archipelago.

== Threats ==
The species was threatened by previous introduction of rabbits (Oryctolagus cuniculus), mice (Mus musculus) and the tobacco tree (Nicotiana glauca) to the Selvagem Grande which were effectively eradicated in the early 2000's. Today, the species is susceptible to soil erosion and consequent landslides from rainstorms that affect the arid archipelago and also native lizards that may predate on eggs. In the longer term the species could be threatened by increased frequency of droughts and sea level changes due to climate change.

It represents about 35% of the diet of yellow-legged gulls that breed on the islands.
