= Deucalion oceanicum =

Scientific classification
- Domain: Eukaryota
- Kingdom: Animalia
- Phylum: Arthropoda
- Class: Insecta
- Order: Coleoptera
- Suborder: Polyphaga
- Infraorder: Cucujiformia
- Family: Cerambycidae
- Genus: Deucalion; Wollaston, 1854
- Species: D. oceanicum

Binomial name
- Deucalion oceanicum Wollaston, 1854

Species of beetle

Deucalion oceanicum is a species of beetle in the family Cerambycidae and the only species in the genus Deucalion. It is endemic to the Savage Islands. The species and genus were described by Thomas Vernon Wollaston in 1854.

== Distribution and habitat ==
This species is currently known to live only on the smallest island of the archipelago, Fora Islet. Living almost entirely off of shrubs of Euphorbia anachoreta, also endemic to the Portuguese islet.

== Description ==
It measures around 9 to 14 mm (0.35 to 0.55 in) and has antennae shorter than the body.
