= Savage Islands Nature Reserve =

Protected area in Portugal

- IUCN category Ia (strict nature reserve)
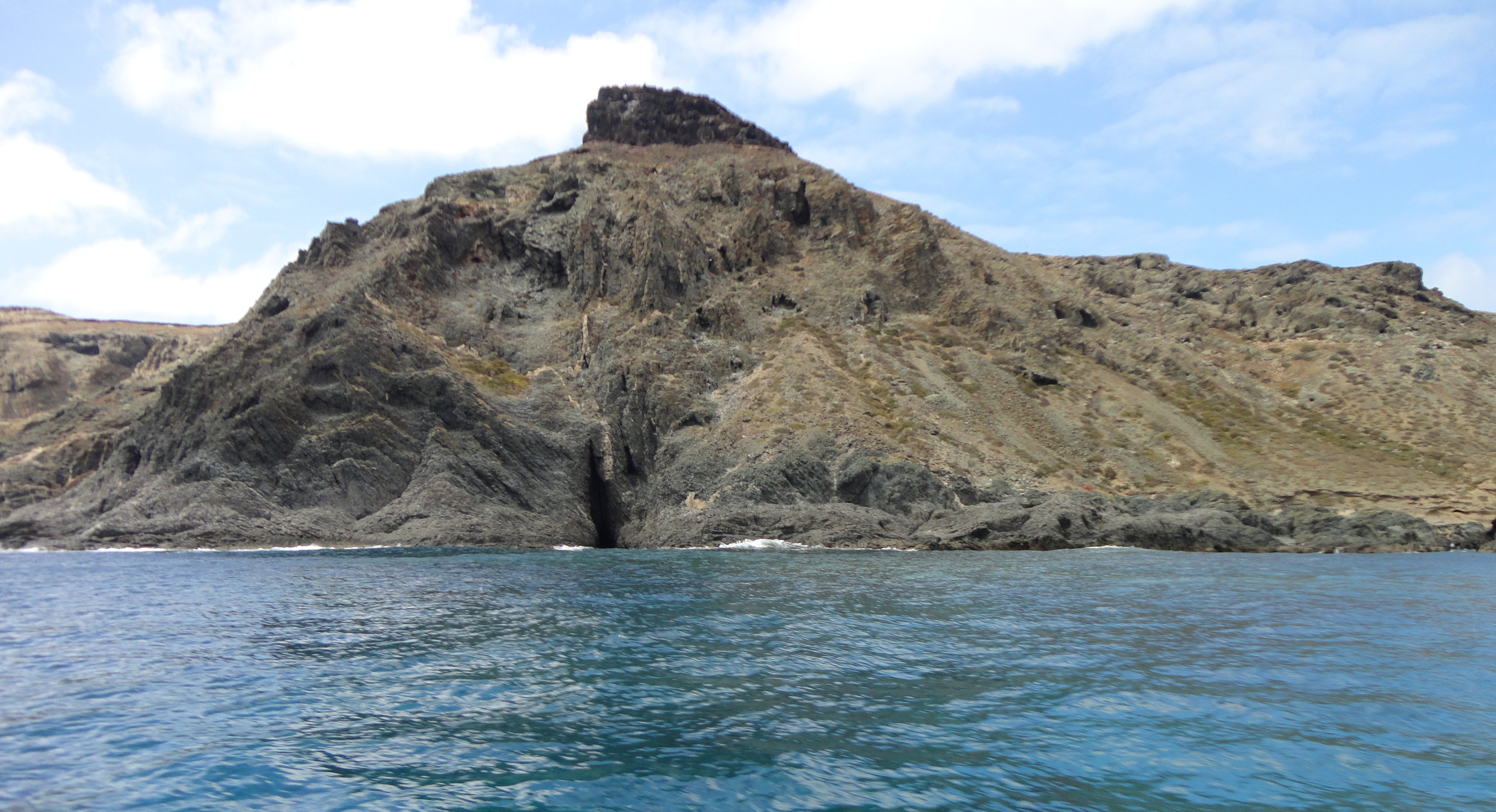
- Selvagem Grande and the surrounding waters

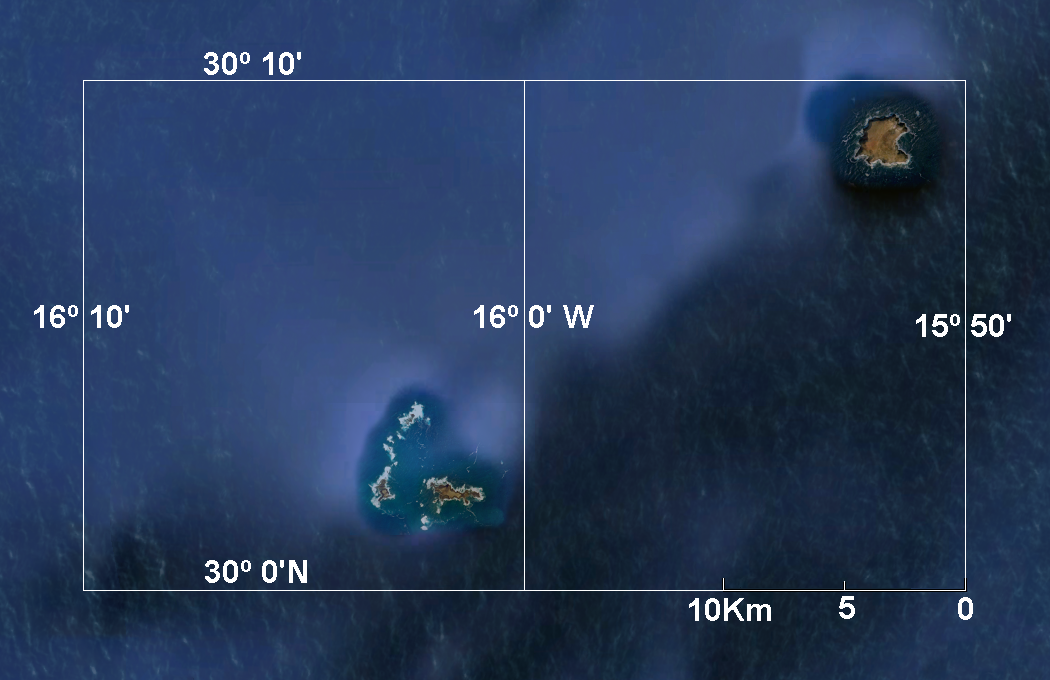
- Location: Savage Islands, Portugal
- Coordinates: 30°5′35.4″N 15°57′20.5″W
- Area: 2,677 km^{2} (1,034 sq mi)
- Established: October 29, 1971
- Governing body: ICNF

Savage Islands Nature Reserve is a Portuguese nature reserve located in the Savage Islands, a small archipelago in the Northeast Atlantic Ocean. Created in 1971, it is one of the oldest protected areas in the country. The strict nature reserve occupies an area of 2,677 km^{2} (1,034 sq mi) after its expansion in 2021, and over 99% of the total area is maritime.

In May 2016, a National Geographic Society scientific expedition prompted the extension of the marine reserve.

== Fauna and flora ==
The natural and scientific interest of this small group of islands lies not only in the seabirds, but in the unique marine biodiversity and flora. Scientific expeditions take place on the islands every year.

The Selvagens have 150 species of plants, most of them creepers. The islands richest in flora are Selvagem Pequena and the islet of Fora, because there has never been any introduction of non-indigenous animals and plants. The islands have become known as a sanctuary for birds: several species nest there. The Rosy Tern also nests on the islands.
