= Deucalion (disambiguation) =

Deucalion is the son of Prometheus, survivor of the Deucalian flood.

Deucalion may also refer to:

== Person ==
- In Greek mythology, see Deucalion (mythology)

== Science and technology ==
- 53311 Deucalion, a trans-Neptunian object
- Deucalion, a red alga genus in the family Wrangeliaceae
- Deucalion (beetle), a beetle in the family Cerambycidae
- Deucalion, a supercomputer in Portugal

== Ships ==
- MV Deucalion, a refrigerated cargo ship that was sunk in 1942 during Operation Pedestal
- USS Deucalion (AR-15), a repair ship built for the United States Navy during World War II

== Fiction ==
- Deucalion (novel), a 1995 novel by Brian Caswell
- Deucalion, one of the names of the main character from Dean Koontz and Kevin J. Anderson's series of novels, Dean Koontz's Frankenstein
- Deucalion, a vampiric bloodline in the role-playing game Vampire: The Requiem
- Deucalion, the name of a dragon in Dianna Wynne Jones book Dark Lord of Derkholm
- Deucalion, the name of a fictional spaceship in Kiddy Grade
- Deucalion, the name of a werewolf in Teen Wolf (2011 TV series)
- Deucalion, the name of the hotel where Morrgian Crow of The Nevermoor series lives in
