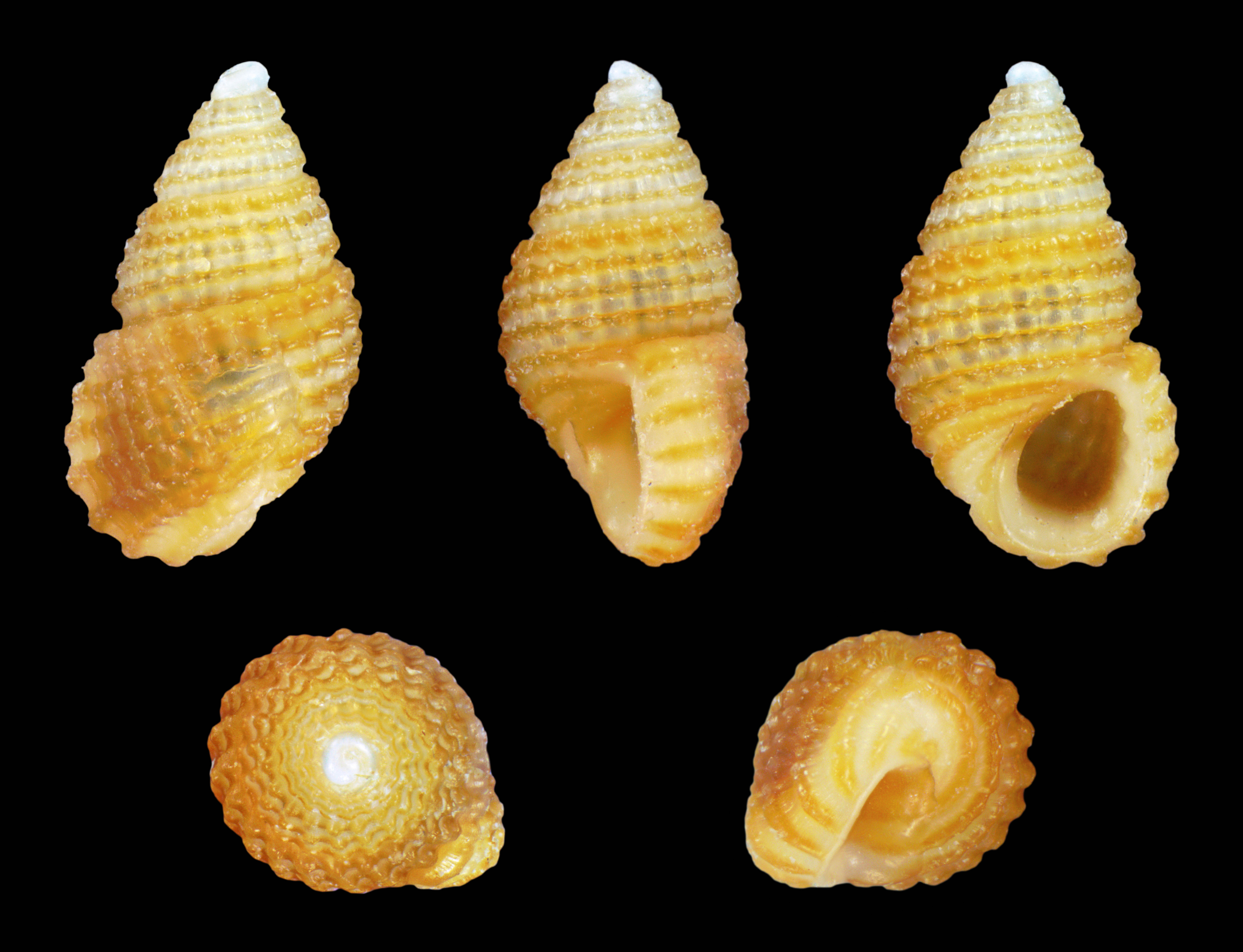
- Several views of a shell of Alvania subcalathus

Scientific classification
- Kingdom: Animalia
- Phylum: Mollusca
- Class: Gastropoda
- Subclass: Caenogastropoda
- Order: Littorinimorpha
- Family: Rissoidae
- Genus: Alvania
- Species: A. subcalathus

Binomial name
- Alvania subcalathus (Dautzenberg & Fischer H., 1906)

Synonyms
- Alvania (Alvania) calathus manzonii Nordsieck, F., 1972; Rissoa calathus Manzoni, A., 1868

= Alvania subcalathus =

Species of gastropod

Alvania subcalathus is a species of minute sea snail, a marine gastropod mollusk or micromollusk in the family Rissoidae.

== Description ==
The shell of A. subcalathus measures between 2.5 mm and 4.3 mm in length. It exhibits the typical rissoid morphology: a small, turriform shell with spiral and axial sculpture visible under magnification, often displaying a glossy, pale-colored surface.

== Distribution ==
This species is found in the northeastern Atlantic Ocean, particularly around the Canary Islands and the Savage Islands. Reports indicate it occurs in subtidal zones, generally at depths down to around 12–20 meters.
