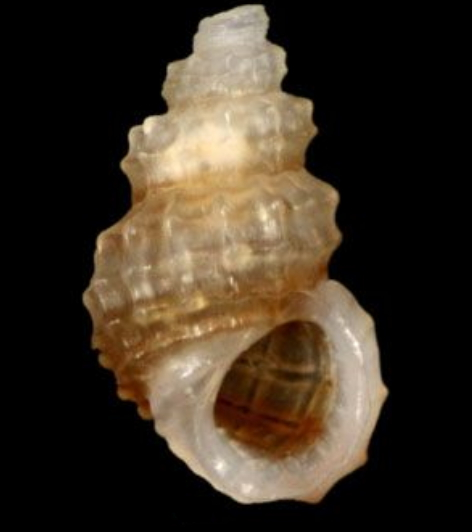
- Shell of Alvania sleursi (specimen at the Natural History Museum, Rotterdam)

Scientific classification
- Kingdom: Animalia
- Phylum: Mollusca
- Class: Gastropoda
- Subclass: Caenogastropoda
- Order: Littorinimorpha
- Superfamily: Rissooidea
- Family: Rissoidae
- Genus: Alvania
- Species: A. sleursi

Binomial name
- Alvania sleursi (Amati, 1987)

Synonyms
- Manzonia (Alvinia) sleursi Amati, 1987

= Alvania sleursi =

Species of gastropod

Alvania sleursi is a species of small sea snail, a marine gastropod mollusk or micromollusk in the family Rissoidae.

== Description ==
The length of the shell varies between 2 mm and 3 mm.

== Distribution ==
This species occurs in the Atlantic Ocean off the Savage Islands, the Azores and Brazil.
