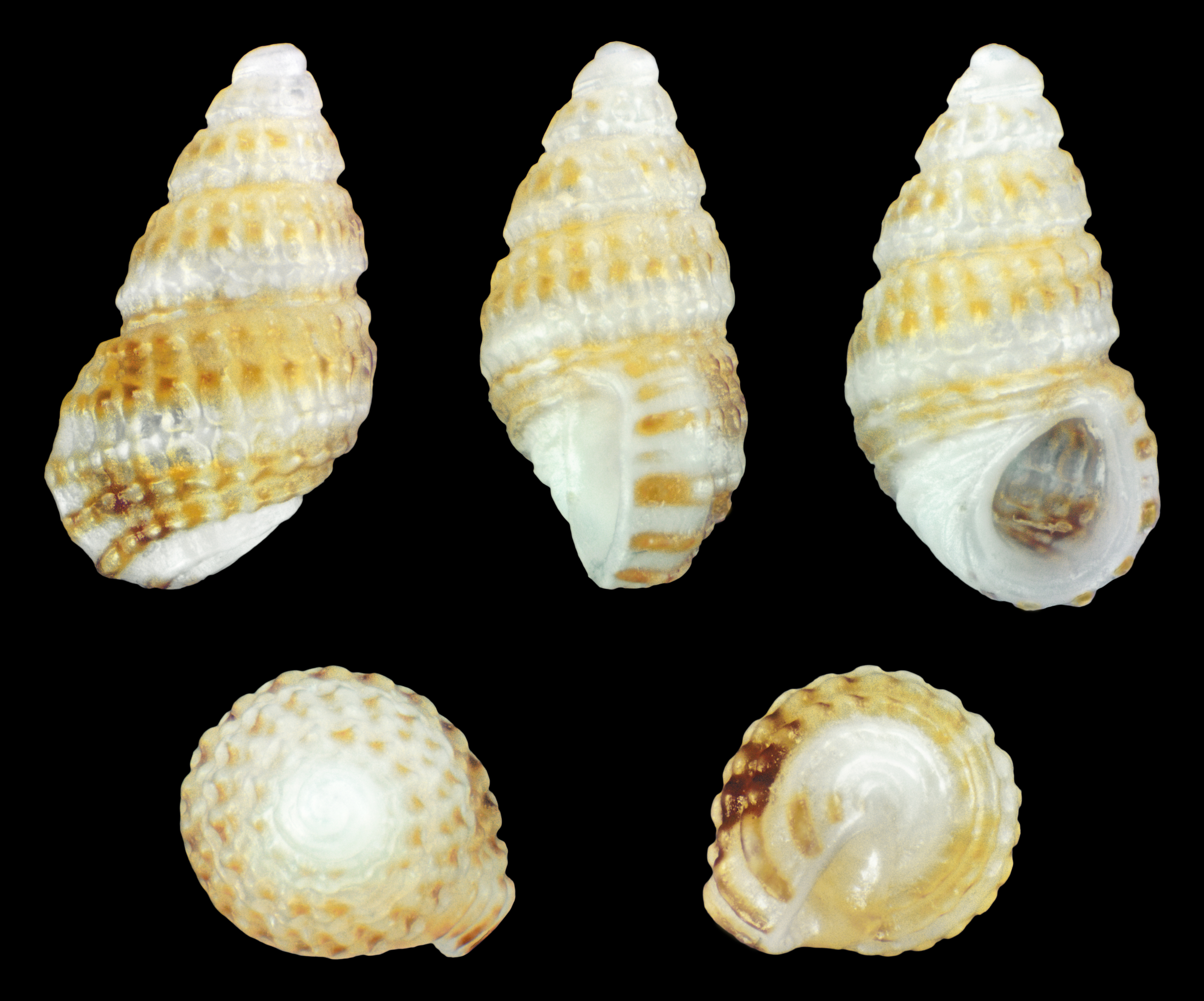

Scientific classification
- Kingdom: Animalia
- Phylum: Mollusca
- Class: Gastropoda
- Subclass: Caenogastropoda
- Order: Littorinimorpha
- Superfamily: Rissooidea
- Family: Rissoidae
- Genus: Alvania
- Species: A. leacocki

Binomial name
- Alvania leacocki (Watson, 1873)

Synonyms
- Rissoa leacocki R. B. Watson, 1873

= Alvania leacocki =

Species of gastropod

Alvania leacocki is a species of small sea snail, a marine gastropod mollusk or micromollusk in the family Rissoidae.

== Description ==
The length of the shell varies between 2.3 mm and 3 mm.

(Original description) The solid shell is conic-oblong, squarely tubercled, transparent and glossy. The two lines of the spire, from the periphery to the apex on the left side of shell, and from apex to extreme corner of the aperture on the right, are perfectly straight, broken only by the square ditch-like sutures, while the basal line connecting these two is an unbroken curve. This arises from the fulness of the base and the thickness of the columella.

Sculpture: There are longitudinal threads, 15 to 18, strong, oblique, traceable from whorl to whorl, disappearing on 1½ whorl, running down almost to the very point of the base. The last appears as a strong broad white labial rib. The spiral threads are of about the same size cross these longitudinal threads, forming large knobs or tubercles at the intersections. These knobs are less strong on lower part of the base, but are often traceable even on the spiral threads of the columella, where they form the only representatives of the longitudinal threads, which die out in the interstices of the spiral threads on the base. Of these spiral threads there are eight or nine on the body whorl. Two additional but feebler ones generally appear between the three highest just before they reach the labial varix, which they all strongly cross, but stop short of the extreme edge of the aperture, leaving in advance of them a plain narrow margin. On the fourth and fifth whorls there are three, on the third two (on this whorl both the longitudinal and spiral threads are smaller relatively to the size of the whorl than on the others). All these markings are abruptly cut off by a cross line, above which is the embryonic 1½ whorl, having a series of quite independent spiral threads, four (on the extreme apex six) in number, and 1/600 inch apart. Besides these markings, the whole surface of the shell when very fresh may be seen to be covered with very faint and superficial spiral striolations. But these are rarely visible. There are also a good many irregular and much coarser, but still very faint longitudinal markings. Both of these can be best seen on the labial varix. They produce a slight frosted appearance.

The colour of the shell is yellowish or faintly brownish white, with two broad spiral bands of colour, the higher and broader extending from the suture, and including the two upper spiral threads, the lower including the two spiral threads below the periphery. Between these two bands of colour one spiral thread with its intersectional knobs stands strongly out in the yellowish-white colour of the shell. On the penultimate whorl, the upper edge of the lower band of colour just shows in the suture. On the superior whorls the two upper spiral threads are coloured, the lower one is pale. The first two whorls are uncoloured. On the labial rib, the end of each spiral thread is coloured: when fresh, this colour is an exquisite brilliant crimson. But it soon fades to a ruddy brown. The whole columella and the interior of the outer lip are opaque white.

The spire is elongated, conical, ending in blunt round point. It contains 5 to 6 whorls, almost perfectly flat, of very gradual increase. The extreme tip of the embryonic whorl is slightly turned in. So that the apex of the shell is formed by a somewhat more advanced part of the first whorl. The suture is straight, rather deep, and very strongly marked, being broad and trough-like. The underside of the trough is perpendicular to its bottom line, the upperside slopes in.

The aperture is white, obliquely set, pear-shaped, flattened across the belly. It is small, with a slight sinus at the upper corner excavated out of the thickness of junction of outer lip and body, very slightly expanded towards the lower outer corner. There are no teeth within the lip. The outer lip is thickened by the strong labial rib. It is straight above, well rounded in its basal sweep. It is slightly sinuated from the forward advance of the lip at lower outer corner. On its forward edge the margin is pretty broad, flat or slightly hollowed into a groove, longitudinally striated, and bears a sharp projecting flange on its inner side forming the extreme aperture-edge. This flange takes its rise on the inner side of the sinus formed at upper corner of aperture, and sweeps all round, until at the point of the pillar it gradually coalesces with the outer lip-margin, and the two thus united become the edge of the columella. The inner lip is white, thin, a very little reflected, slightly projecting from the thick and heavy columella so as to leave a narrow chink, faintly continued across the body.

== Distribution ==
This species occurs in the Atlantic Ocean off the Canary Islands, Madeira and the Selvagens.
