= AR15 (disambiguation) =

AR15 most commonly refers to AR-15 style rifle designs made by various manufacturers after the patent on the Colt AR-15. It may also refer to:

== Firearms ==
- AR-15–style pistol, a handgun similar to an AR-15 rifle, but with a shorter barrel and no buttstock
- ArmaLite AR-15, a selective fire rifle designed by ArmaLite and a predecessor to the United States M16 rifle
- CAR-15, a line of compact, short barrel, selective-fire carbines manufactured by Colt
- Colt AR-15, a semi-automatic rifle manufactured and trademarked by Colt's Manufacturing Company, based on the original ArmaLite AR-15 design
- List of Colt AR-15 & M16 rifle variants, for Colt-made firearms based on the original ArmaLite AR-15 design

== Other ==
- Area 15 (Nevada National Security Site), the location of three underground nuclear detonations during the 1960s
- Arkansas Highway 15, the designation for two state highways in Arkansas
- Asiarunner, a locomotive in service with the Vietnam Railways (designated as AR15 VR)
- USS Deucalion (AR-15), a repair ship built for the United States Navy during World War II
- AR15.com, a firearm-enthusiast web forum
- Anthony Richardson (American football), an NFL quarterback for the Indianapolis Colts
- Austin Reaves, a professional basketball player for the Los Angeles Lakers
