= Alvania harrietae =

Scientific classification
- Kingdom: Animalia
- Phylum: Mollusca
- Class: Gastropoda
- Subclass: Caenogastropoda
- Order: Littorinimorpha
- Superfamily: Rissooidea
- Family: Rissoidae
- Genus: Alvania
- Species: A. harrietae

Binomial name
- Alvania harrietae Segers, Swinnen & De Prins, 2009

Species of gastropod

Alvania harrietae is a species of minute sea snail, a marine gastropod mollusk or micromollusk in the family Rissoidae.

== Description ==
The length of the shell varies between 2.3 mm and 3 mm.

== Distribution ==
This species occurs in the Atlantic Ocean off Selvagens and Madeira.
