= Alvania dijkstrai =

Scientific classification
- Kingdom: Animalia
- Phylum: Mollusca
- Class: Gastropoda
- Subclass: Caenogastropoda
- Order: Littorinimorpha
- Family: Rissoidae
- Genus: Alvania
- Species: A. dijkstrai

Binomial name
- Alvania dijkstrai (Hoenselaar & Goud, 1998)

Species of gastropod

Alvania dijkstrai is a species of minute sea snail in the family Rissoidae.

== Description ==
It has an ovate shell, 2.10 to 2.75 millimetres (0.083 to 0.108 in) in height and 1.25 to 1.50 millimetres (0.049 to 0.059 in) in length with a thin outer lip. Sometimes two rows of very vague, light brown dots are visible on the ultimate whorl, one just subsutural and one on the shell base.

== Distribution ==
It is endemic to the Selvagens Archipelago off Northwest Africa.
