= Convent of Santa Clara (Funchal) =

Convent in Madeira, Portugal

- Convento de Santa Clara
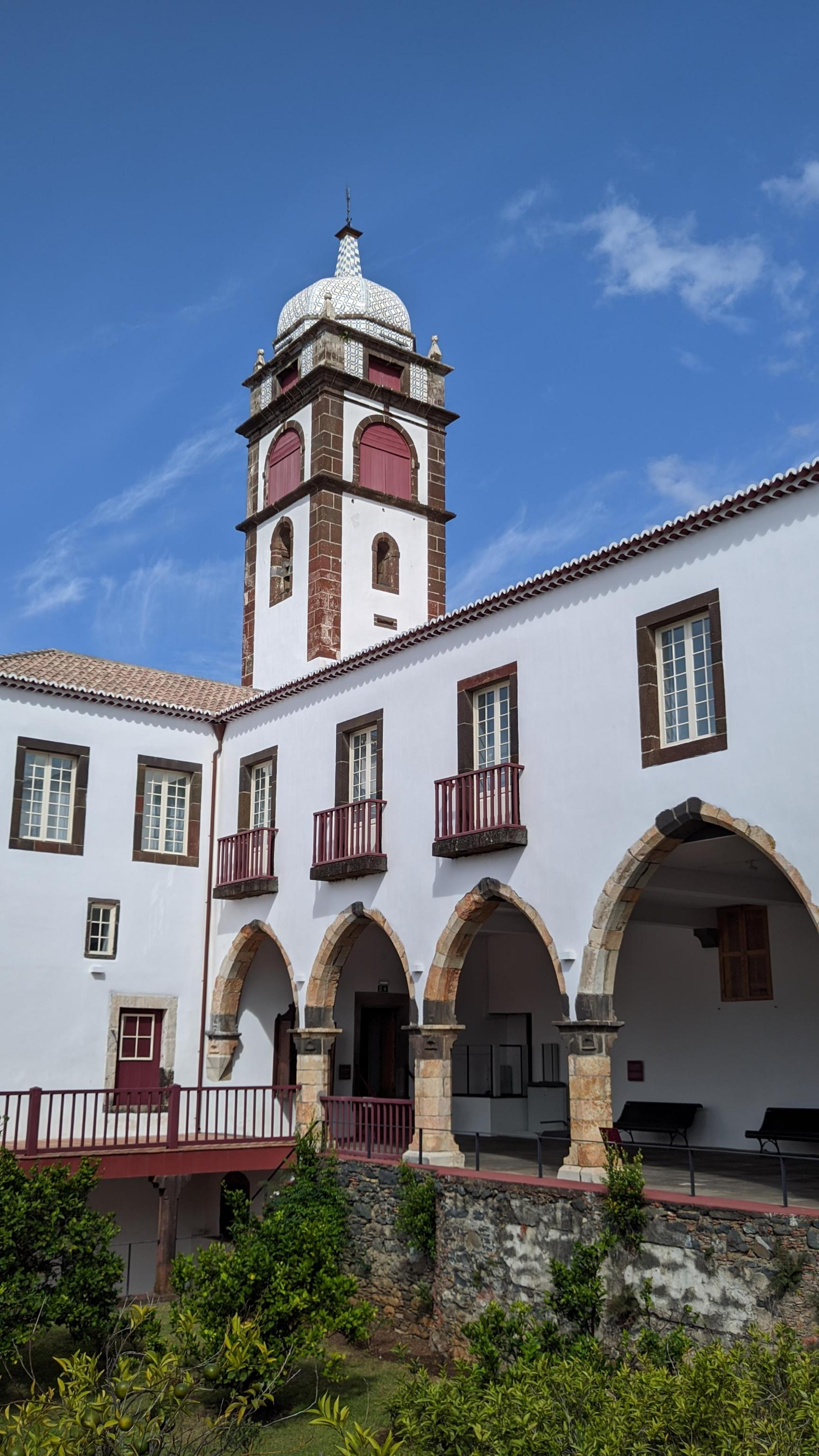

Religion
- Affiliation: Catholic Church

Location
- Location: Sé, Funchal
- Country: Portugal
- Interactive map of Convent of Santa Clara
- Coordinates: 32.651241°N 16.913401°W

The Convent of Santa Clara is a convent of clarisses in Funchal, Madeira, Portugal. It was built on the late 15th century to house the daughters of nobility in the island.

The convent was developed around a primitive church, church of Nossa Senhora da Conceição de Cima, ordered by João Gonçalves Zarco, the island's discover and first donatary captain of Funchal, to be his family tomb.

Its construction began on 1492 and finished in 1497 under the order of João Gonçalves da Câmara, Funchal's second donatary captain and son of João Gonçalves Zarco.

The convent ceased functioning with the dissolution of the monasteries in Portugal in the 19th century.
