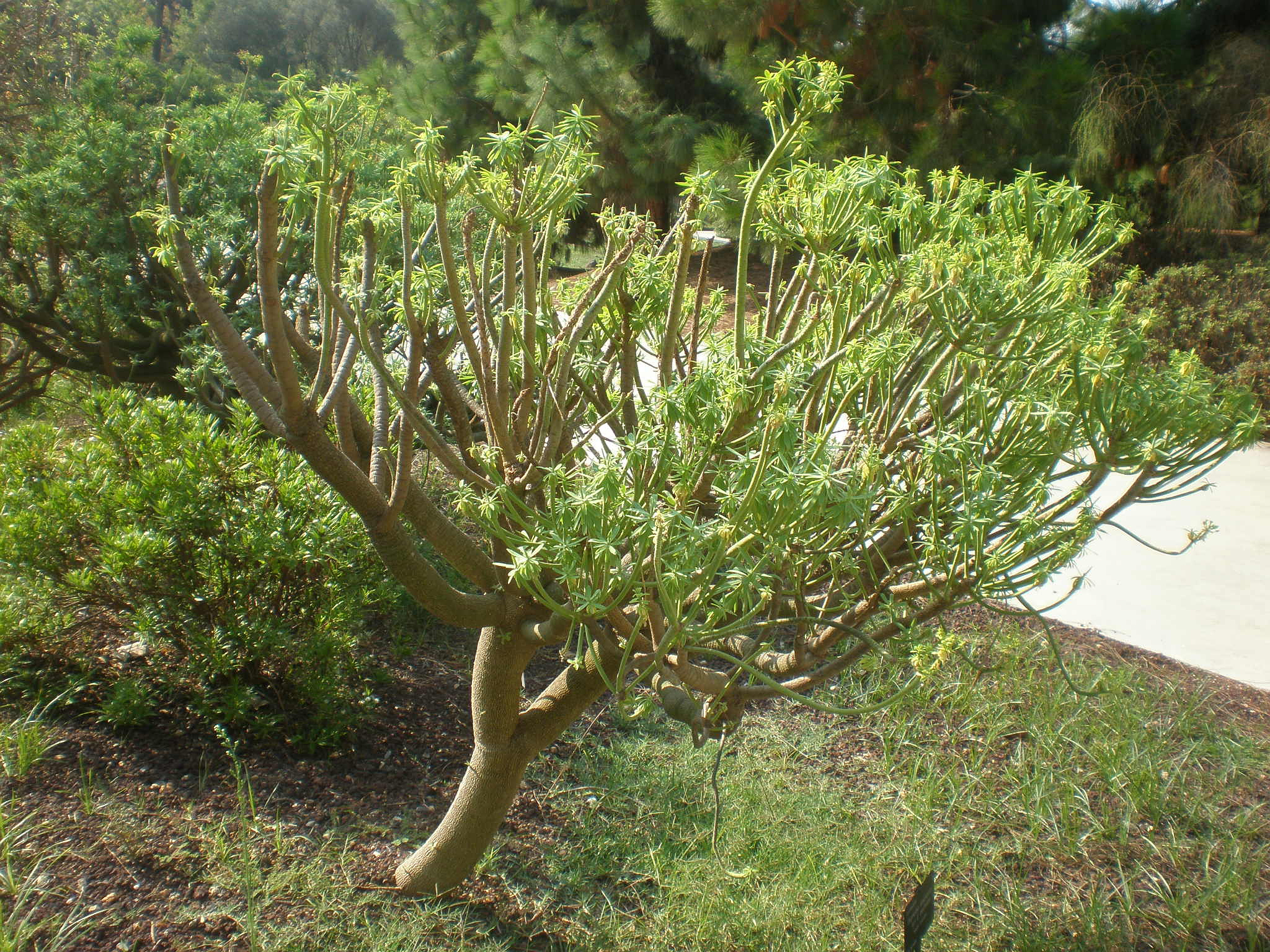

Conservation status
- Critically Endangered (IUCN 3.1)
- CITES Appendix II (CITES)

Scientific classification
- Kingdom: Plantae
- Clade: Tracheophytes
- Clade: Angiosperms
- Clade: Eudicots
- Clade: Rosids
- Order: Malpighiales
- Family: Euphorbiaceae
- Genus: Euphorbia
- Species: E. anachoreta

Binomial name
- Euphorbia anachoreta Svent.

Synonyms
- Euphorbia obtusifolia var. despoliata Menezes; Euphorbia despoliata (Menezes) Monod; Euphorbia lamarckii var. despoliata (Menezes) Oudejans

= Euphorbia anachoreta =

Species of flowering plant

Euphorbia anachoreta is a species of flowering plant in the family Euphorbiaceae, endemic to the Fora Islet of the Savage Islands. This species has been considered a Critically Endangered species due to its highly restricted population size. As most other succulent members of the genus Euphorbia, its trade is regulated under Appendix II of CITES.

In the wild, it grows in the crags of basaltic rocks, where it is sheltered from salty winds.
