= Alvania freitasi =

Scientific classification
- Kingdom: Animalia
- Phylum: Mollusca
- Class: Gastropoda
- Subclass: Caenogastropoda
- Order: Littorinimorpha
- Family: Rissoidae
- Genus: Alvania
- Species: A. freitasi

Binomial name
- Alvania freitasi Segers, Swinnen & De Prins, 2009

Species of gastropod

Alvania freitasi is a species of minute sea snail, a marine gastropod mollusk or micromollusk in the family Rissoidae.

== Description ==
The length of the shell attains 2 mm.

== Distribution ==
This marine species occurs in the Selvagens Archipelago
