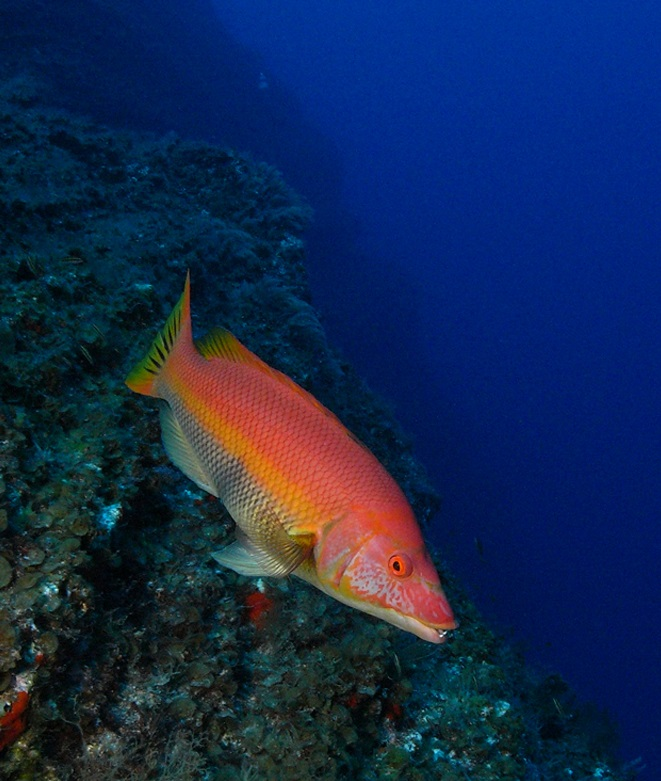

Conservation status
- Vulnerable (IUCN 3.1)

Scientific classification
- Kingdom: Animalia
- Phylum: Chordata
- Class: Actinopterygii
- Order: Labriformes
- Family: Labridae
- Genus: Bodianus
- Species: B. scrofa

Binomial name
- Bodianus scrofa (Valenciennes, 1839)

Synonyms
- Labrus scrofa Valenciennes, 1839; Cossyphus scrofa (Valenciennes, 1839); Diastodon scrofa (Valenciennes, 1839); Lepidaplois scrofa (Valenciennes, 1839); Pseudolepidaplois scrofa (Valenciennes, 1839); Trochocopus scrofa (Valenciennes, 1839); Crenilabrus caninus R. T. Lowe, 1839; Pseudolepidaplois pfaffi Bauchot & Blanc, 1961

= Barred hogfish =

Species of fish

The barred hogfish (Bodianus scrofa) is a species of wrasse native to the eastern Atlantic Ocean, where it occurs around the Macaronesian island groups of the Azores, Madeira, the Canary Islands and Cape Verde. This species occurs on rocky reefs at depths of 20 to 200 m (66 to 656 ft). It can reach a length of 43 cm (17 in), though most do not exceed 30 cm (12 in). It is of minor importance to local commercial fisheries. This species was formally described as Labrus scrofa in 1839 by Achille Valenciennes with the type locality given as the Cape Verde Islands.
