= Madeira Nature Reserve =

The Madeira Nature Reserve covers about two thirds of the area of Madeira Island. It was created in 1982.

== Main Protected Areas in the Madeira Nature Reserve ==
- Ilhas Desertas Nature Reserve
- Ilhas Selvagens Nature Reserve
- Parcial do Garajau Nature Reserve
- Rocha do Navio Nature Reserve
