= Selvagem Pequena Island =

Island of the Savage Islands in Madeira, Portugal

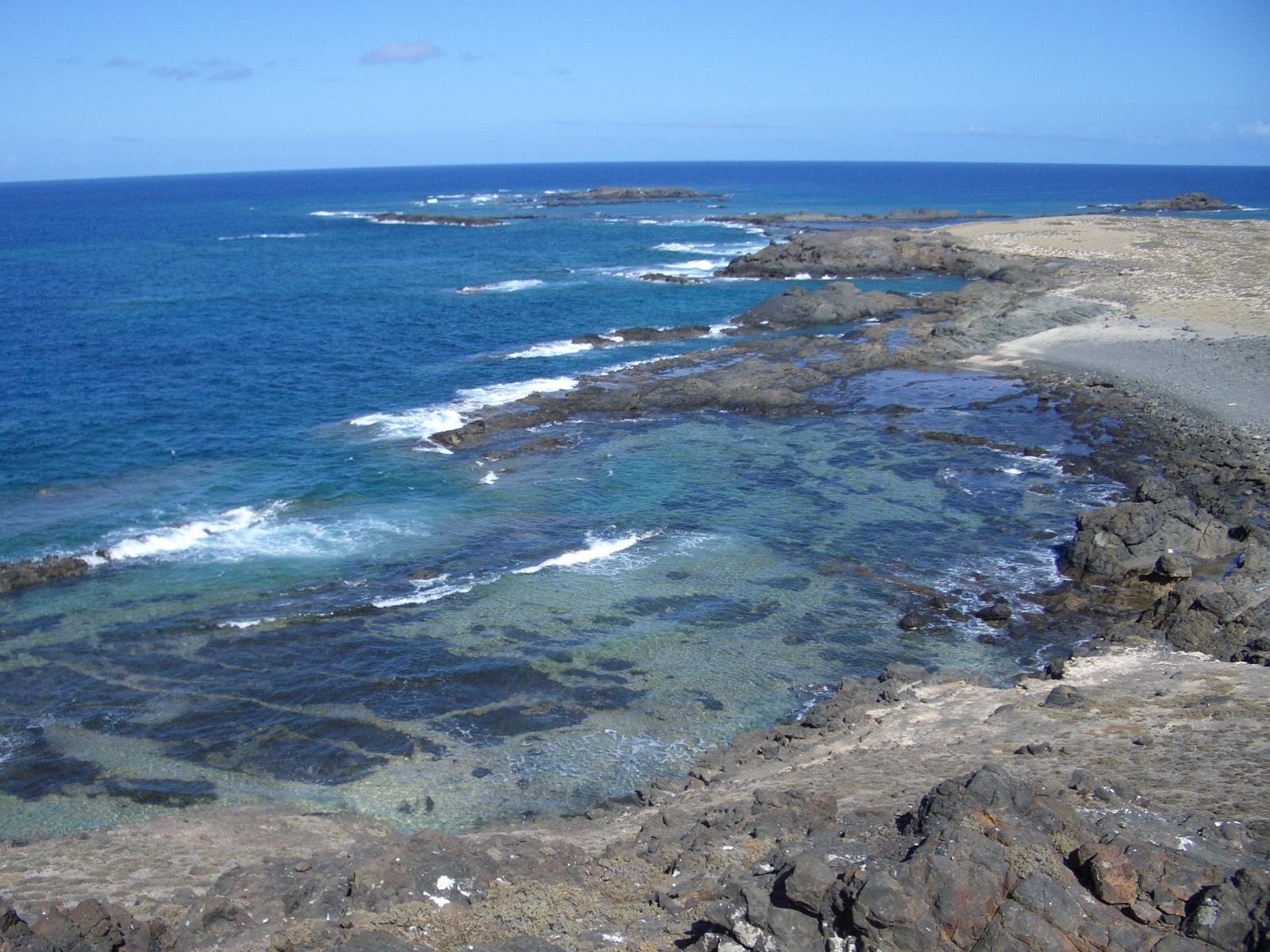
- Coast line of Selvagem Pequena

Geography
- Location: Atlantic Ocean
- Coordinates: 30°02′03″N 16°01′37″W
- Archipelago: Savage Islands
- Area: 0.3 km^{2} (0.12 sq mi)
- Highest elevation: 49 m (161 ft)
- Highest point: Pico do Veado

Administration
- Portugal
- Autonomous Region: Madeira
- Municipality: Funchal
- Freguesia: Sé

Demographics
- Population: uninhabited

Selvagem Pequena Island (800 by 500 metres (2,600 ft × 1,600 ft)) is an island in the southeast group of the Savage Islands, Madeira, Portugal. It is the southernmost major island of Portugal (excluding islets). Its fauna and flora are well-preserved due to lack of human interference.

In the 1890 book The Cruise of the Alerte, the island was called the 'Great Piton'.

It has an active lighthouse.

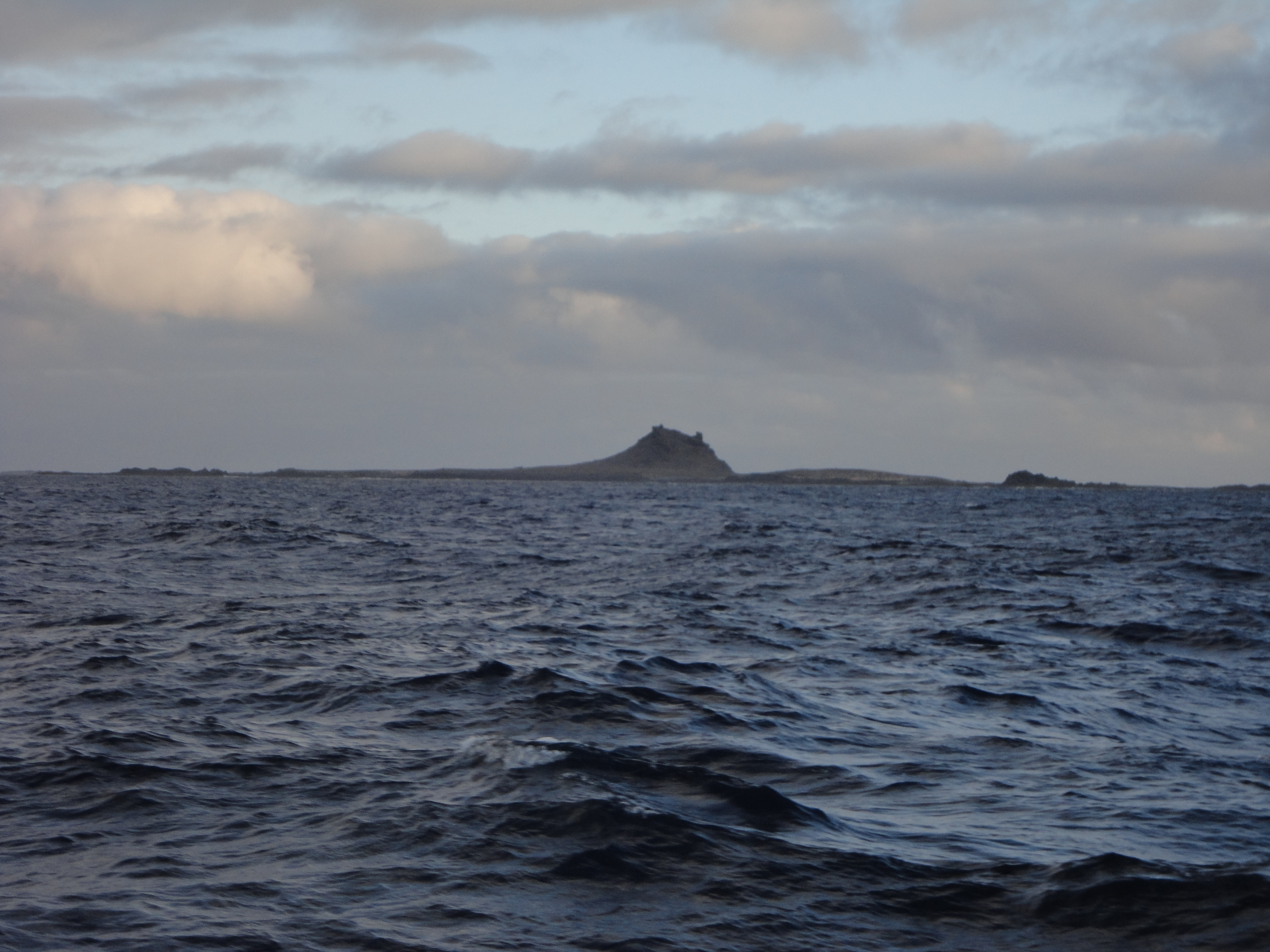
Selvagem Pequena seen from Selvagem Grande.
