= Fora Islet =

Native name: Ilhéu de Fora
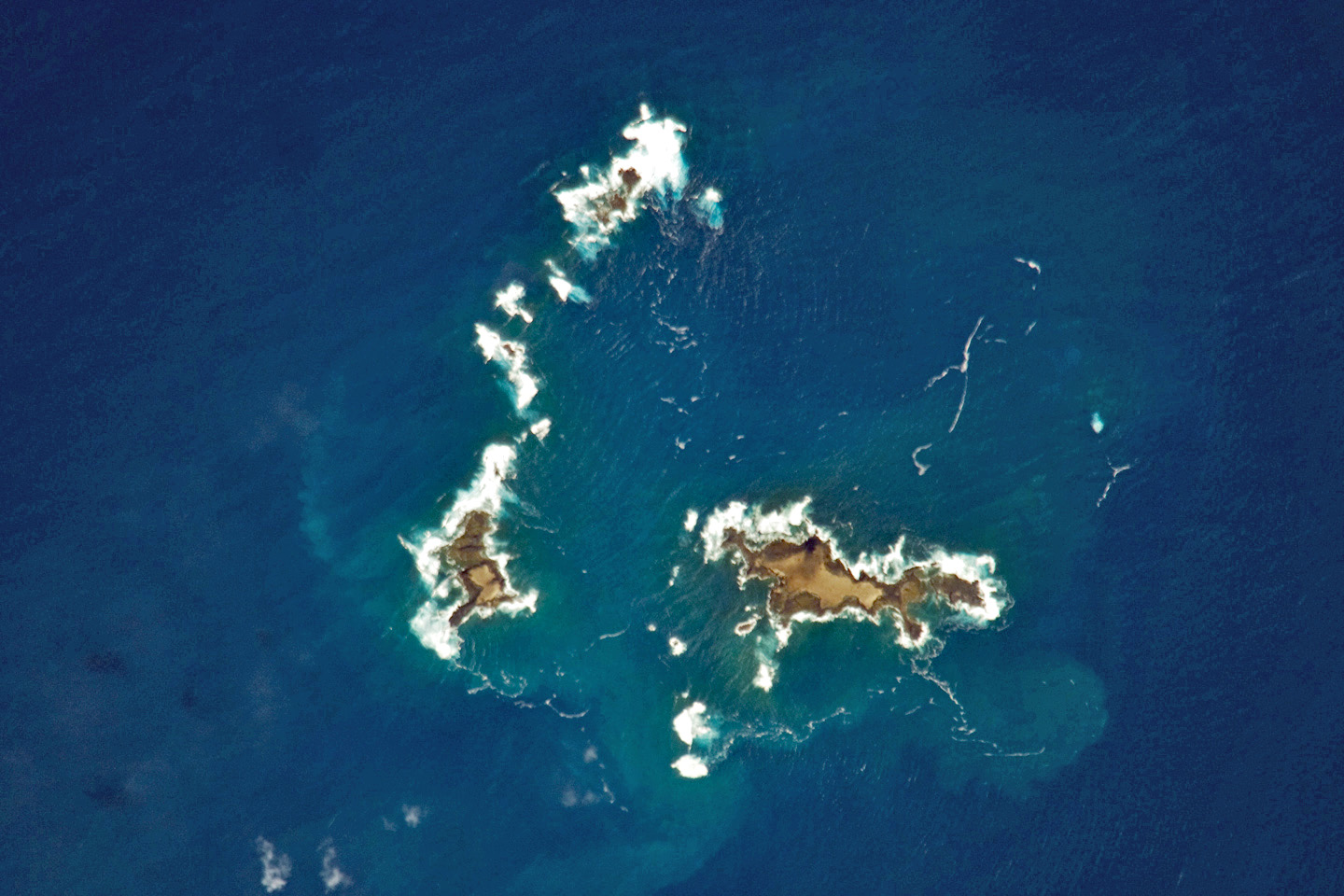
- Satellite image of the southwest group with Selvagem Pequena (bottom-right), Fora Islet (bottom-left) and the Norte Islets (top).

Geography
- Location: Atlantic Ocean
- Coordinates: 30°02′N 16°03′W
- Archipelago: Savage Islands
- Area: 0.08 km^{2} (0.031 sq mi)
- Highest elevation: 18 m (59 ft)
- Highest point: unnamed

Administration
- Portugal
- Autonomous Region: Madeira
- Municipality: Funchal
- Freguesia: Sé

Demographics
- Population: uninhabited

Fora Islet (Portuguese: Ilhéu de Fora ("outer islet")) is an uninhabited Portuguese island in the Atlantic Ocean, forming part of the Savage Islands, a dependant archipelago of the autonomous region of Madeira.

It lies about 300 kilometres from Madeira and 160 kilometres north of the Canary Islands. The islet (500 by 300 metres (1,640 ft × 980 ft)) has an area of 8 hectares and a maximum altitude of 18 metres.

The island is part of a nature reserve and is home to a variety of petrels, Cory's shearwater being one of the dominant species. The climate is dry and there is very little soil.

In 19th-century English literature, the island was called the 'Little Piton'.

== See also ==
- List of islands of Portugal
