= USS Deucalion =

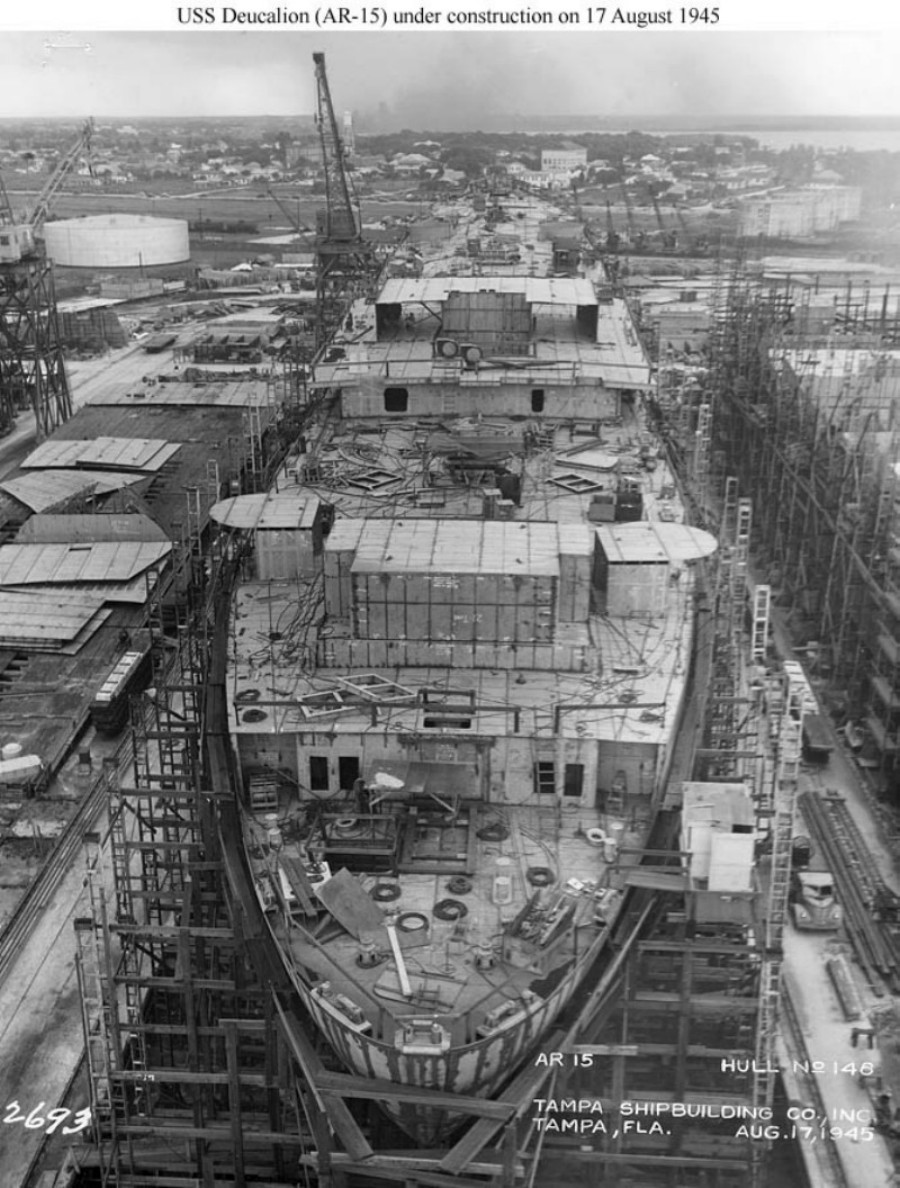

History

United States
- Name: USS Deucalion
- Ordered: 4 August 1944
- Builder: Tampa Shipbuilding Company
- Laid down: 15 December 1944
- Identification: AR-15
- Fate: Canceled, 12 August 1945 Fate unknown

General characteristics
- Class & type: Amphion-class repair ship
- Displacement: 7,826 light, 16,900 lim.
- Length: 492 ft (150 m)
- Beam: 69 ft 6 in (21.18 m)
- Draft: 26 ft 6 in (8.08 m)
- Propulsion: 8500HP, Westinghouse Curtis turbine, 1 screw
- Speed: 18.4 knots (34.1 km/h; 21.2 mph)
- Complement: 741
- Armament: 2 × 5 in (130 mm) guns; 4 × twin 40 mm; 8 × twin 20 mm
- Notes: Largest Boom Capacity 30 t.

USS Deucalion (AR-15) was the third ship of the Amphion-class of repair ship built for the United States Navy by Tampa Shipbuilding Company during World War II. Named after Deucalion the mythological king of Thessaly, her keel was laid down on 15 December 1944, but her construction was canceled on 12 August 1945, shortly after the Atomic bombings of Hiroshima and Nagasaki.

Designed and built to carry out a primary mission of making emergency and routine repairs to ships of the fleet during periods of technical availability, Deucalion was to be equipped with a wide variety of repair shops: shipfitter, carpentry, pipe and copper, sheet metal, welding, canvas, watch, optical, foundry—in short, facilities that employed skilled artificers capable of repairing hardware from precision watches to heavy machinery and hulls. "These shops are limited in what they can do, only by the size of their equipment." Her modern engineering plant could generate enough electricity for not only herself but ships moored alongside undergoing repairs. Her distilling plant could produce water for herself and for other vessels.
