= Savage Islands =

Macaronesian archipelago in the North Atlantic

Coordinates: 30°08′26″N 15°52′09″W

Ilhas Selvagens (Portuguese)
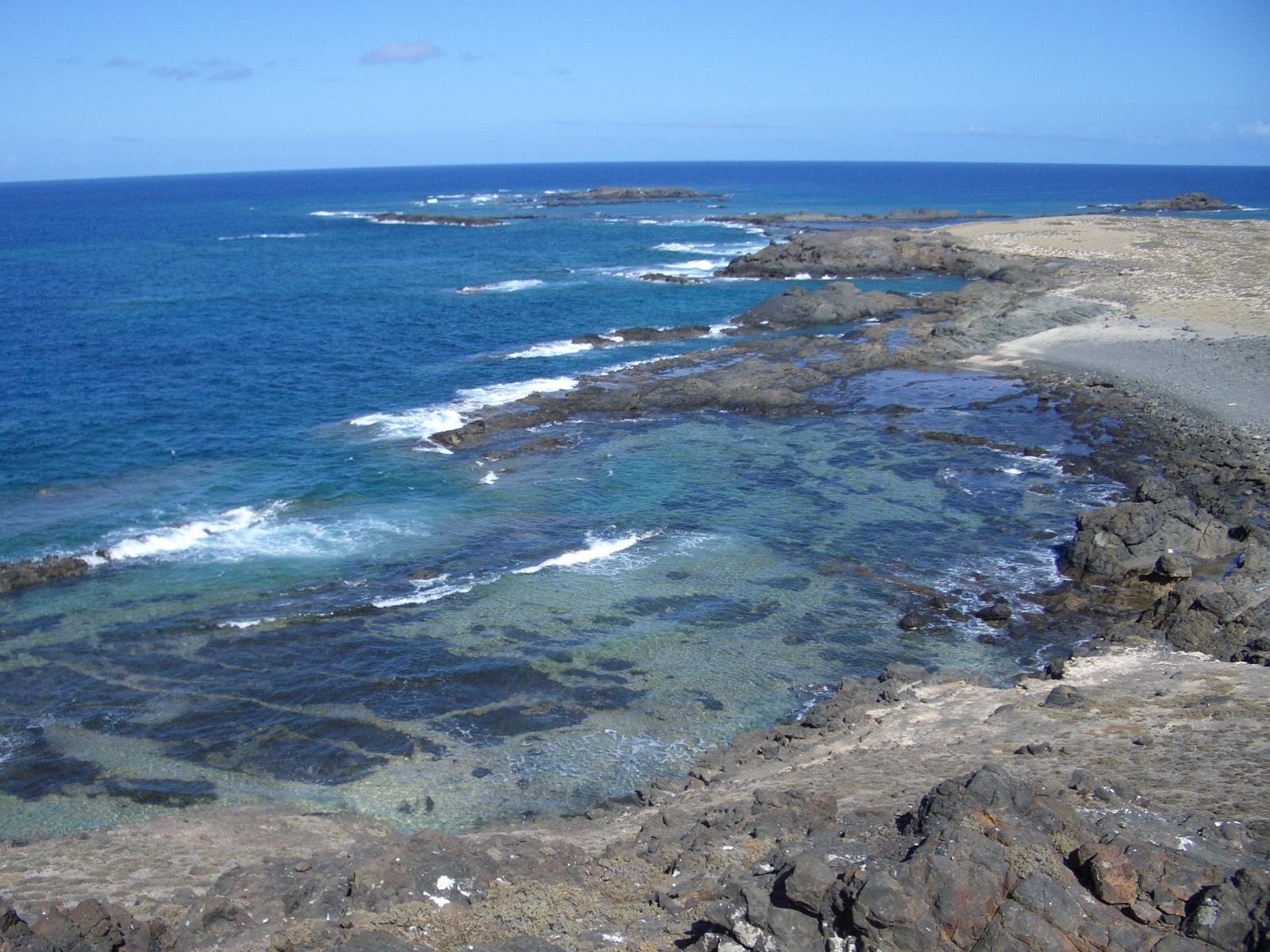
- A reef along the coast of Selvagem Pequena, the smaller of the main islands

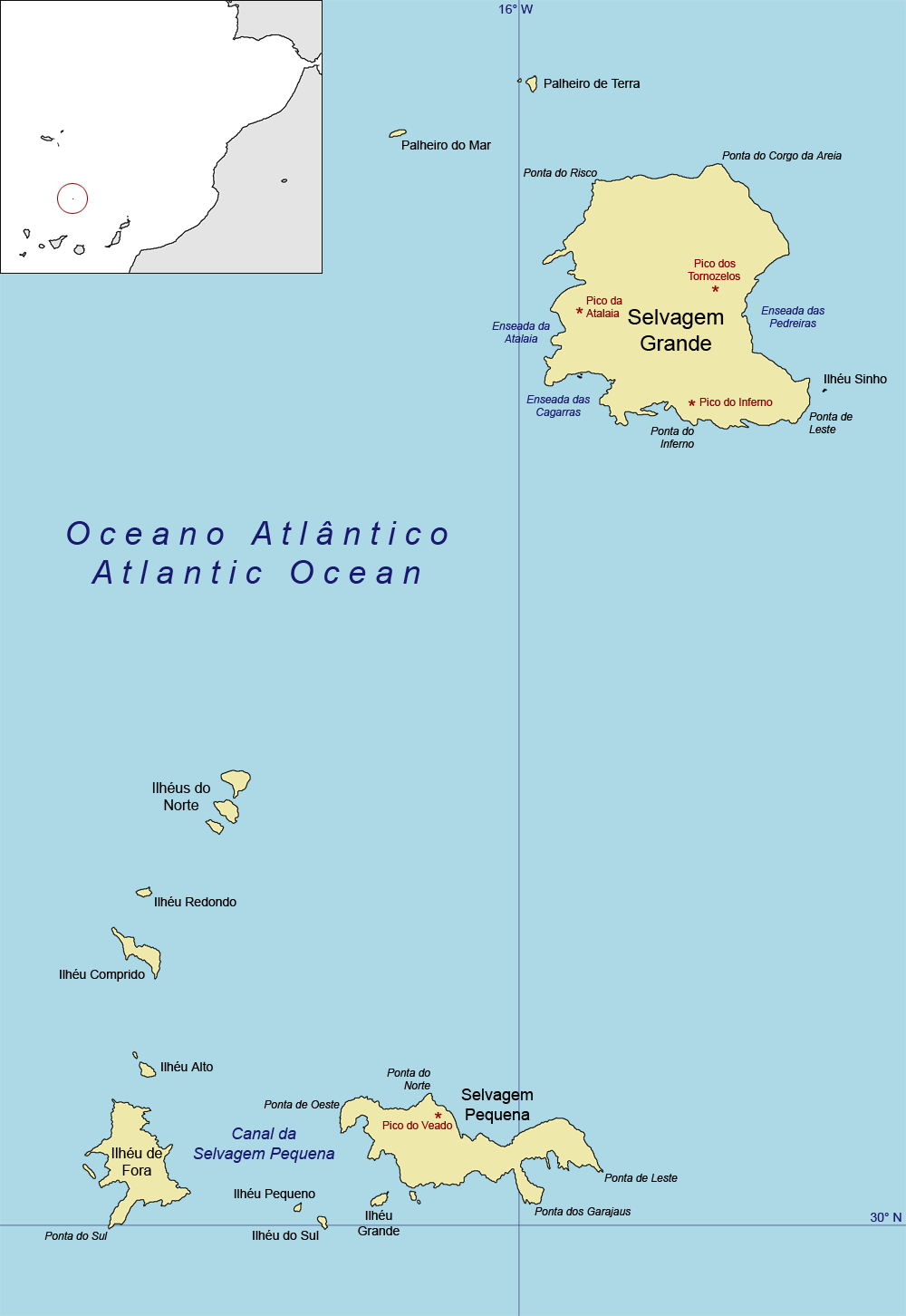
- Location of the Savage Islands in the Atlantic Ocean
- Other names: Selvagens Islands; Salvage Islands

Geography
- Location: Atlantic Ocean
- Area: 2.73 km^{2} (1.05 sq mi)
- Highest elevation: 163 m (535 ft)
- Highest point: Pico da Atalaia

Administration
- Portugal
- Autonomous Region: Madeira
- Municipality: Funchal
- Freguesia: Sé

Demographics
- Population: 0 (2000)

Additional information
- Geographic detail from CAOP (2010) produced by Instituto Geográfico Português (IGP)

The Savage Islands, or Selvagens Islands (Portuguese: Ilhas Selvagens, IPA: [ˈiʎɐʃ sɛlˈvaʒɐ̃jʃ]; also known as the Salvage Islands), are a small Portuguese archipelago in the North Atlantic Ocean, 280 kilometres (175 mi) south of Madeira and 165 kilometres (105 mi) north of the Canary Islands. The archipelago includes two major islands, Selvagem Grande and Selvagem Pequena, each surrounded by a cluster of islets and reefs, with the total area of 2.73 km^{2} (1.05 sq mi). The archipelago is administered as part of the Portuguese municipality of Funchal, belongs to the Madeiran civil parish of Sé, and is the southernmost point of Portugal.

It was designated a natural reserve in 1971, recognising its role as a very important nesting point for several species of birds. Since then, the susceptible bird populations (namely Cory's shearwater) and nearby waters have been more closely protected by the Portuguese government. Given its status, remoteness and few fresh water sources, the archipelago is today largely uninhabited. The only residents year-round are stationed on Selvagem Grande Island, which includes reserve staff and scientists conducting research on wildlife. Two rangers are also usually resident on Selvagem Pequena between May and October. In May 2016, a National Geographic Society scientific expedition prompted the extension of the marine reserve.

== Geography ==
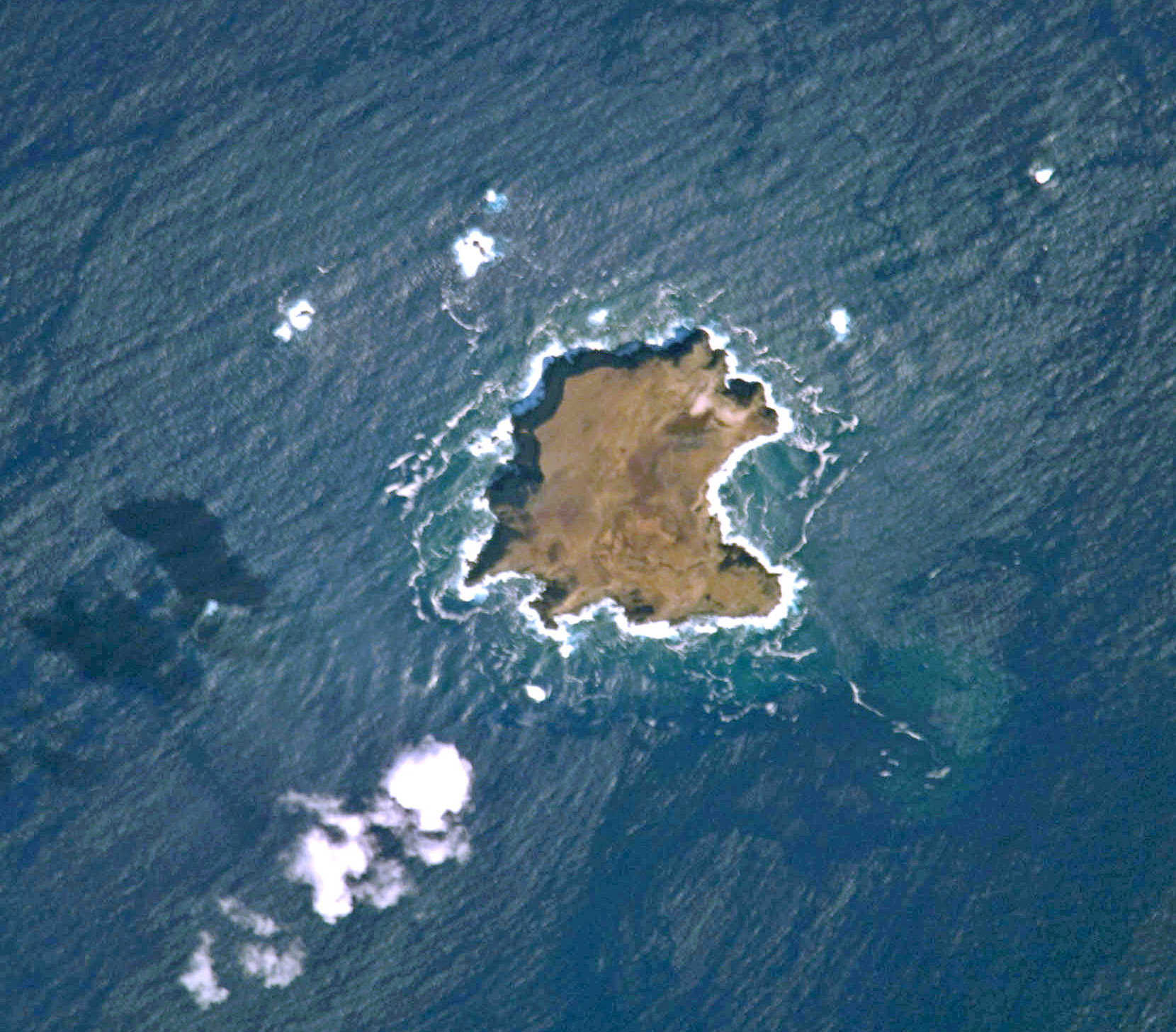
Aerial photograph of the Northeastern Group, including Selvagem Grande

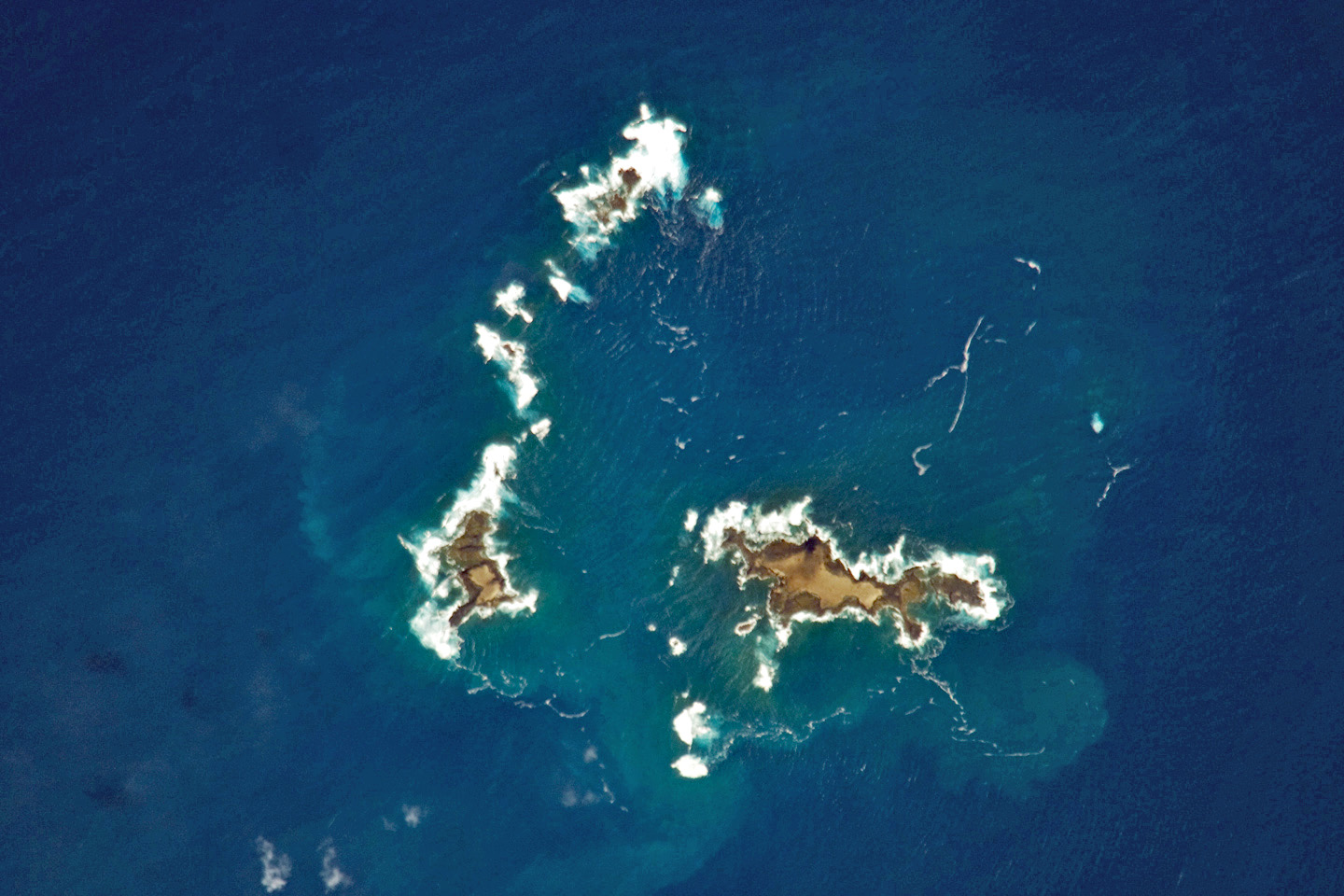
Aerial photograph of the Southwestern Group, including several islets and Selvagem Pequena

The Savage Islands are part of Macaronesia, which comprises several island groups in the North Atlantic Ocean, near Europe and off the coast of Morocco in North Africa. The archipelago lies about 255 km (158 mi) from Madeira and 176 km (109 mi) from the Canary Islands. The islands are considered to be a column branch that extends from the Canary Islands at a depth of 3,000 m (10,000 ft). The total land area of the Savage Islands is 2.73 km^{2} (1.05 sq mi). They have little fresh water and are surrounded by reefs (which make access difficult and dangerous). The archipelago consists of two major islands and several islets, in two groups about 15 km (9 mi) apart, designated:

- Northeast Group – includes the main island of Selvagem Grande (2,000 by 1,700 metres (6,600 ft × 5,600 ft)) and three small islets: Sinho Islet (Portuguese: Ilhéu Sinho), Palheiro do Mar, and Palheiro da Terra.
- Southwest Group – including the main island of Selvagem Pequena (800 by 500 metres (2,600 ft × 1,600 ft)) and Fora Islet (Portuguese: Ilhéu de Fora, 500 m × 300 m (1,640 ft × 980 ft)), also called Great Piton and Little Piton respectively, it is surrounded by a group of very small islets (Alto, Comprido and Redondo) and a group collectively known as the Northern Islets (Portuguese: Ilhéus do Norte).

The geological history of the archipelago can be traced to the Opening of the North Atlantic Ocean 200 million years ago (mya), at the end of the Triassic period.

The islands' physical characteristics are the consequences of mountain-forming and volcanic forces that occurred between 60 to 70 mya, typical of many of the islands of Macaronesia. The islands were created during the Oligocene period 29 mya, from a large submarine volcano generated by the Canary hotspot and shaped by erosion and marine sedimentation. The larger islands and islet (Grande, Pequena and Fora, respectively) are the remnants of the peaks of these submarine mounts, and although located north of the Canaries, they were never connected to the African continent or any other continental landmass.

The archipelago had 2 historic magmatic activity periods, one 29.5 mya and the other one 3.4 mya and two significant hiatuses between eruptions, the first lasted 12 million years and the second lasted 4.6 million years, a unique occurrence to oceanic volcanic islands.

The islands themselves are crossed by many calcareous faults, some marbleised, and made of basaltic rock, ash, and other volcanic materials. On Selvagem Grande there are remnants of extinct cones, such as Atalaia, Tornozelos and Cabeço do Inferno. Other areas are sand covered from extensive aeolian, fluvial and marine erosion; headlands include Atalaia and Leste on Selvagem Grande, and Norte, Oeste, Leste and Garajaus on Selvagem Pequena.

Beaches are uncommon in the islands, although Selvagem Pequena has some beaches of cobbles and coarse and medium sands.

== Climate ==
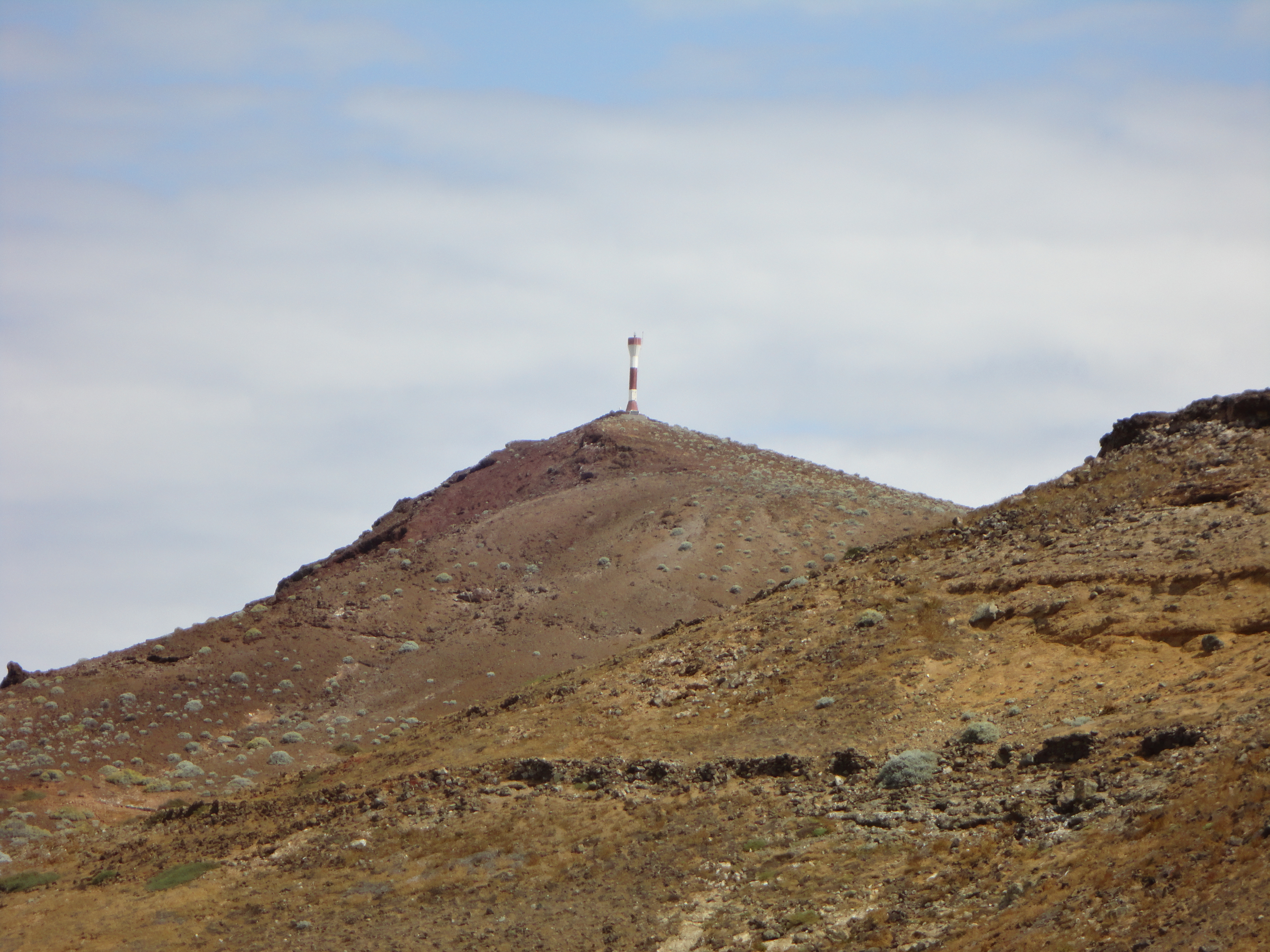
A view of the arid plateau of Selvagem Grande (with lighthouse at the top)

Though only as recently as 2016 was a meteorological station installed by IPMA on Selvagem Grande, the islands are regarded as having a mild subtropical desert climate (Köppen: BWh), with temperatures warmer than those of Madeira. Due to their small size, the surrounding Atlantic and other exterior factors dictate the weather patterns felt throughout the year. Both diurnal and seasonal temperature variation are very low. The lack of any significant mountain range diminishes the amount of orographically induced precipitation and its exposure to the cool Canary Current prevents the formation of convective clouds for most of the year. Summers hover between 25–27 °C (77–81 °F) during the day and 19–20 °C (66–68 °F) during the night, and winters average around 21–23 °C (70–73 °F) during the day and 12–13 °C (54–55 °F) during the night. Saharan dust can occasionally come into contact with the islands, bringing much higher temperatures. Winds blowing from south-west can also bring exceptionally heavy rainfall. The dominant wind direction is Northeast (NE).

In the past these islands would have had a higher level of moisture than they do now, which may justify the presence of a large number of fossil shells of land snails (Theba macandrewiana) on the plateau of Selvagem Grande.

Climate data for Selvagem Grande, 2017, 2018, 2020, 2021, 2024 & 2025 normals, 2017-2021 extremes, altitude: 150 m (490 ft)
Month	Jan	Feb	Mar	Apr	May	Jun	Jul	Aug	Sep	Oct	Nov	Dec	Year
Record high °C (°F)	21.7 (71.1)	23.1 (73.6)	26.2 (79.2)	25.2 (77.4)	25.0 (77.0)	26.0 (78.8)	25.6 (78.1)	27.8 (82.0)	27.9 (82.2)	31.4 (88.5)	25.1 (77.2)	24.6 (76.3)	31.4 (88.5)
Mean daily maximum °C (°F)	21.5 (70.7)	21.7 (71.1)	23.1 (73.6)	23.4 (74.1)	23.4 (74.1)	25.0 (77.0)	25.0 (77.0)	26.2 (79.2)	27.7 (81.9)	27.4 (81.3)	26.0 (78.8)	23.2 (73.8)	24.5 (76.1)
Daily mean °C (°F)	17.4 (63.3)	17.0 (62.6)	17.4 (63.3)	18.3 (64.9)	19.2 (66.6)	20.7 (69.3)	21.6 (70.9)	22.6 (72.7)	22.9 (73.2)	22.1 (71.8)	20.5 (68.9)	18.5 (65.3)	19.8 (67.7)
Mean daily minimum °C (°F)	13.3 (55.9)	12.5 (54.5)	12.8 (55.0)	13.2 (55.8)	14.9 (58.8)	17.4 (63.3)	18.5 (65.3)	20.0 (68.0)	19.6 (67.3)	17.8 (64.0)	15.8 (60.4)	14.0 (57.2)	15.8 (60.5)
Record low °C (°F)	11.1 (52.0)	11.0 (51.8)	11.4 (52.5)	12.8 (55.0)	13.5 (56.3)	15.8 (60.4)	18.4 (65.1)	19.3 (66.7)	19.1 (66.4)	15.1 (59.2)	13.5 (56.3)	14.9 (58.8)	11.0 (51.8)
Average precipitation mm (inches)	9.9 (0.39)	8.7 (0.34)	12.3 (0.48)	14.1 (0.56)	3.1 (0.12)	1.2 (0.05)	0.3 (0.01)	0.4 (0.02)	0.2 (0.01)	3.0 (0.12)	20.7 (0.81)	8.2 (0.32)	82.1 (3.23)
Average relative humidity (%)	73	75	74	79	76	81	82	83	80	83	78	73	78
Source: Instituto Português do Mar e da Atmosfera

Average wind speed (km/h) 2017, 2018 & 2020
	Jan	Feb	Mar	Apr	May	Jun	Jul	Aug	Sep	Oct	Nov	Dec	Year
Selvagem Grande	31.1	31.0	32.4	23.5	25.3	25.5	33.0	32.8	24.5	22.6	25.7	27.3	28.4

== Fauna and flora ==
The scientific and natural interest of this group of islands lies in its marine biodiversity, flora and fauna. Many avian species breed annually on its rock cliffs or use them on their stopover on normal migratory patterns.

The Savage Islands and their surrounding waters present pristine marine and terrestrial communities, with many of their ecosystems in an unaltered state (such as in Selvagem Pequena and Ilhéu de Fora). With habitat for a wide variety of endemic species and species under threats of extinction, they are a unique example of the Macaronesian biogeographical region biota.

The archipelago has the highest density (per 100 km^{2}) of exclusive endemic terrestrial plants of the Macaronesian Region and the lowest number of exotic terrestrial plants taxa (17) of the Madeira Region.

Although commercial tours of the islands and their biomes are available, all visitors require authorisation from the Madeira Nature Park, the regional environmental authority.

=== Birds ===
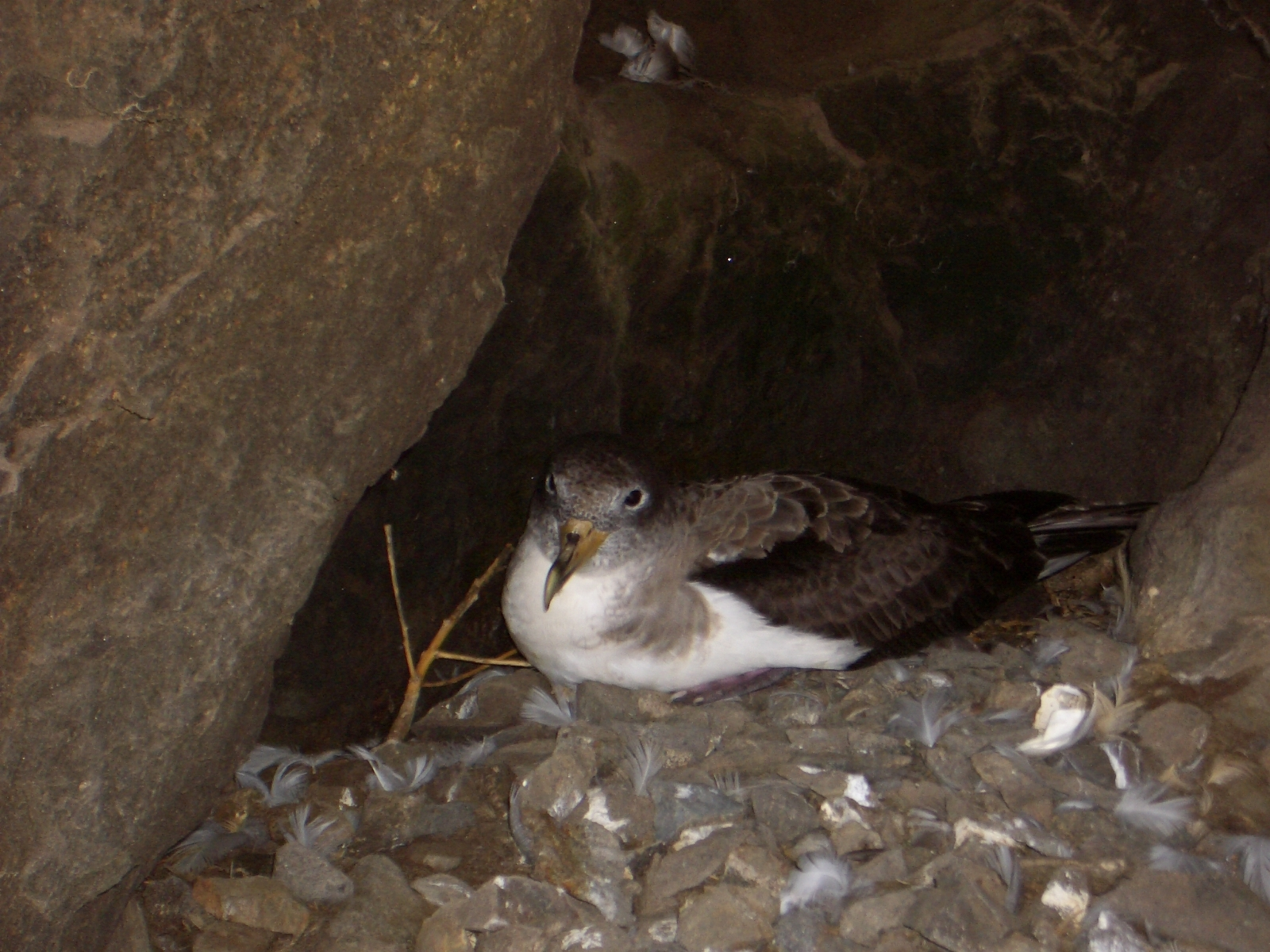
Cory's shearwater roosting in her nest within the crags on the island of Selvagem Pequena

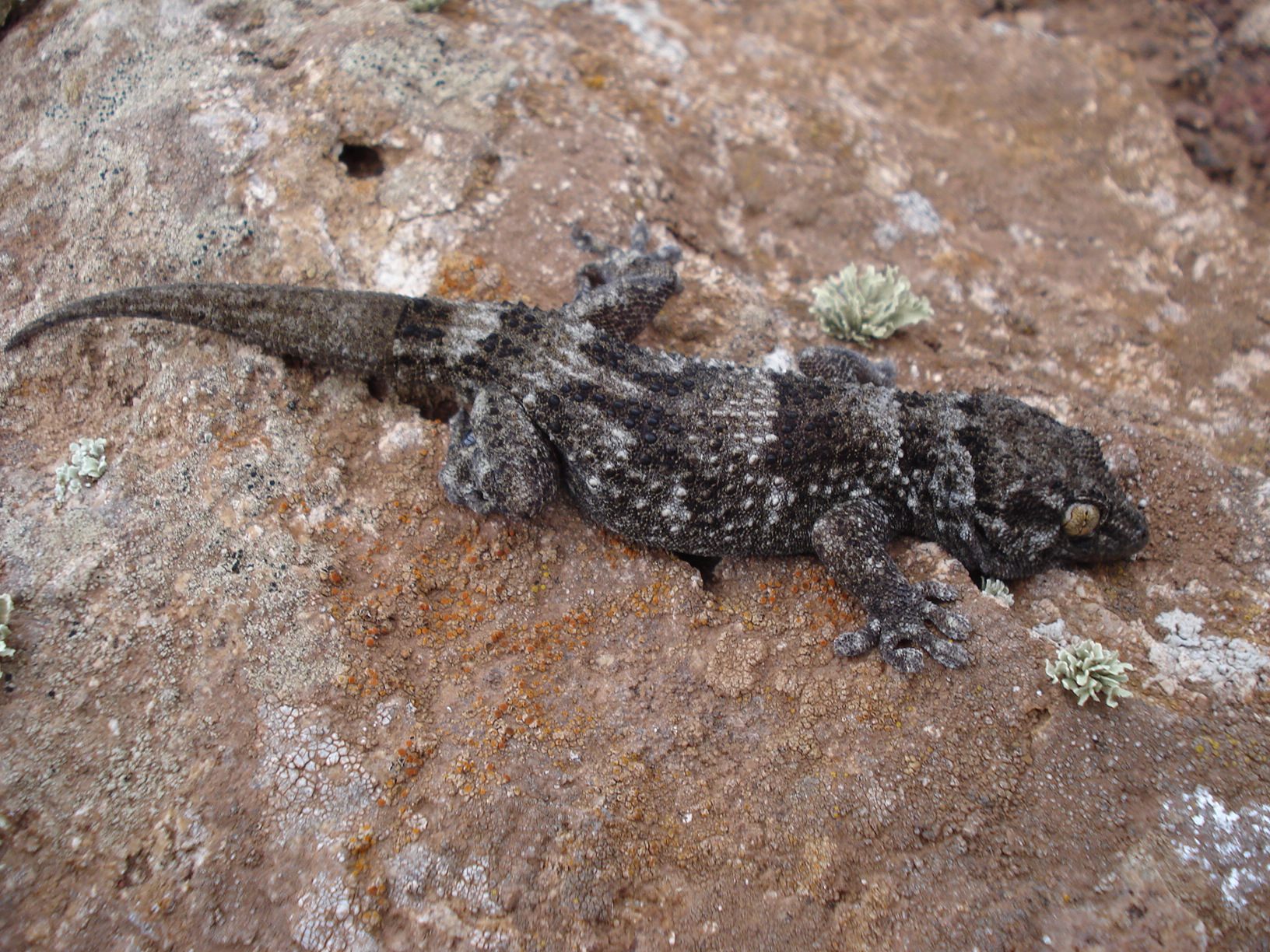
Boettger's wall gecko

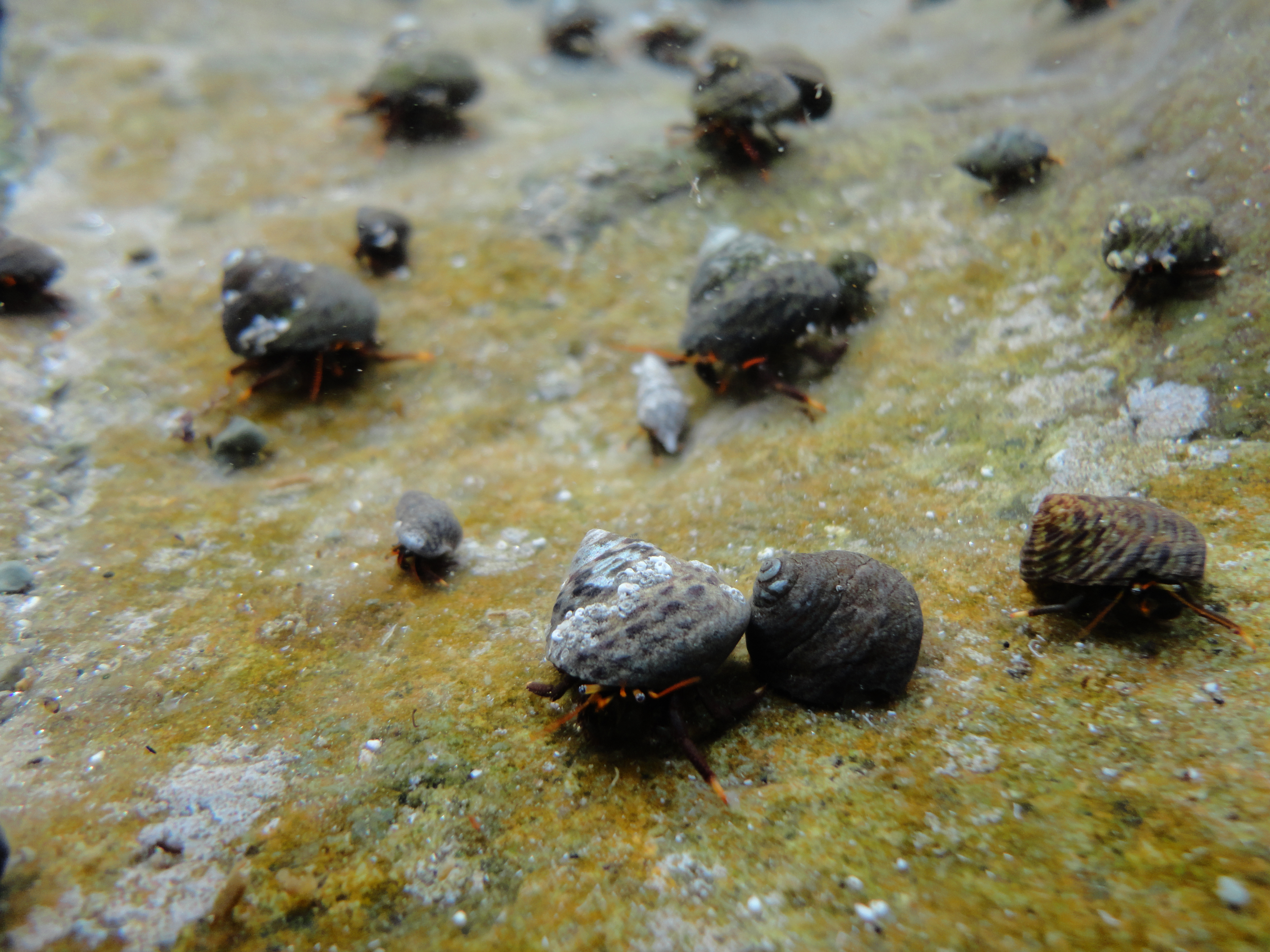
Arthropods (like this species of hermit crab) make up about 92% of the native invertebrate species

Savage Islands are one of the most important breeding areas for seabirds of Macaronesia and the North Atlantic, offering conditions that are unique in all the world. About 3% of the birds species are resident species, the remaining are migratory species. The abundance of birds on the islands, at one time, made the islands an attractive hunting area for peoples of the region. At the end of the 19th century the German naturalist Ernst Schmitz noted that 20–22,000 Cory's shearwaters were hunted in September or October in the islands; the hunts continued until 1967. Madeiran expeditions to the islands were responsible for the killing of juvenile birds for food, while their down was used to stuff pillows and comforters.

Presently the islands are home or stopover for: Cory's shearwaters (>30,000), white-faced storm-petrel (>80,000), Bulwer's petrel (approximately 4000), North Atlantic little shearwater (1400), Madeiran storm-petrel (1500), yellow-legged gull (50), common tern (>60), roseate tern (<5) and Berthelot's pipit (the only resident bird species); which are subjects of annual scientific expeditions. Many of these species are vulnerable to other local predator bird species, like the yellow-legged gull, which will consume both eggs and chicks (the white-faced storm-petrel and Bulwer's petrel are primarily susceptible). The islands are home to the largest known breeding colony in the world of Cory's shearwater and the only site in the Atlantic where Swinhoe's storm petrel can be regularly found. The Savage archipelago has been recognised as an Important Bird Area (IBA) by BirdLife International because of its seabird colonies.

=== Sea life ===
Jacques-Yves Cousteau once found what he believed were "the cleanest waters in the world" around this minor archipelago; there is an abundance of marine activity, much endemic to the environment, including the barred hogfish, puffer fish (Tetraodontidae), sea spider and many species of sea urchin. At depth of about 30 m (100 ft) the waters around the islands are teeming with algae and many migratory species of common fish, routinely migrating from the islands of Cape Verde, Madeira and the Canaries.

Out of eight total species of sea turtle in the world, five of them occur in Savage Islands waters. The most frequent is the loggerhead turtle, followed by Kemp's ridley sea turtle, hawksbill sea turtle, green sea turtle and leatherback sea turtle.

A total of 10 cetacean species are recorded for the Savage Islands' surrounding waters, including some with a "Vulnerable" or "Threatened" global conservation statuses according to IUCN list of threatened species such as fin whales, sperm whales, bottlenose dolphins, common dolphins, short-finned pilot whales, Atlantic spotted dolphins, pygmy sperm whale, sei whale, Bryde's whale and a non-confirmed beaked whale species, but many others are expected to be discovered. The sub-tropical geographical position of the Savage Islands puts it at the limit of the northern distribution range of many tropical oceanic cetaceans species and at the southern limit of species from more temperate latitudes.

Despite having a much smaller submerged area with depths less than 60 m (200 ft) than other larger Macaronesian archipelagos, the islands have remarkable fish species richness. There are 88 known species of coastal fish, some of them included in endangered and vulnerable status such as the dusky grouper, the Island grouper or the barred hogfish. 27.3% of fish are from the tropical eastern Atlantic Ocean, 10.2% from temperate waters and 6.8% from subtropical waters.

=== Other animals ===
Ten terrestrial vertebrates are known to live on these islands. Two terrestrial reptiles—Tarentola boettgeri bischoffi, a subspecies of Boettger's wall gecko, and Teira dugesii selvagensis, a subspecies of Madeiran wall lizard—are exclusive to the Savage Islands. The islands are the only terrestrial mammal-free archipelago in the Macaronesia of the North Atlantic.

The Savage archipelago is a hotspot of endemic terrestrial arthropods. There are about 219 species and subspecies of terrestrial invertebrates, 92% accounting for arthropods. About 20% of the whole taxa is endemic to the islands. Some endemic species include the sea snails Adeuomphalus marbisensis, Sticteulima lata, Alvania dijkstrai, Alvania freitasi, Alvania harrietae, Atlanta selvagensis, Manzonia boucheti, Osilinus atratus selvagensis and the land snail Theba macandrewiana.

Other terrestrial invertebrates endemic to the islands include three species of Cossoninae, two species of spider beetles, Cryptorhynchinae and Malachiinae and a species of bean weevil, click beetle, thrips, Harpalinae, Pterostichinae, Lamiinae, Paederinae, Trogossitinae, Julida and a recently discovered species of Aplocnemus.

The current number of known endemic species and subspecies is certainly a poor estimate of its real number.

=== Plant life ===
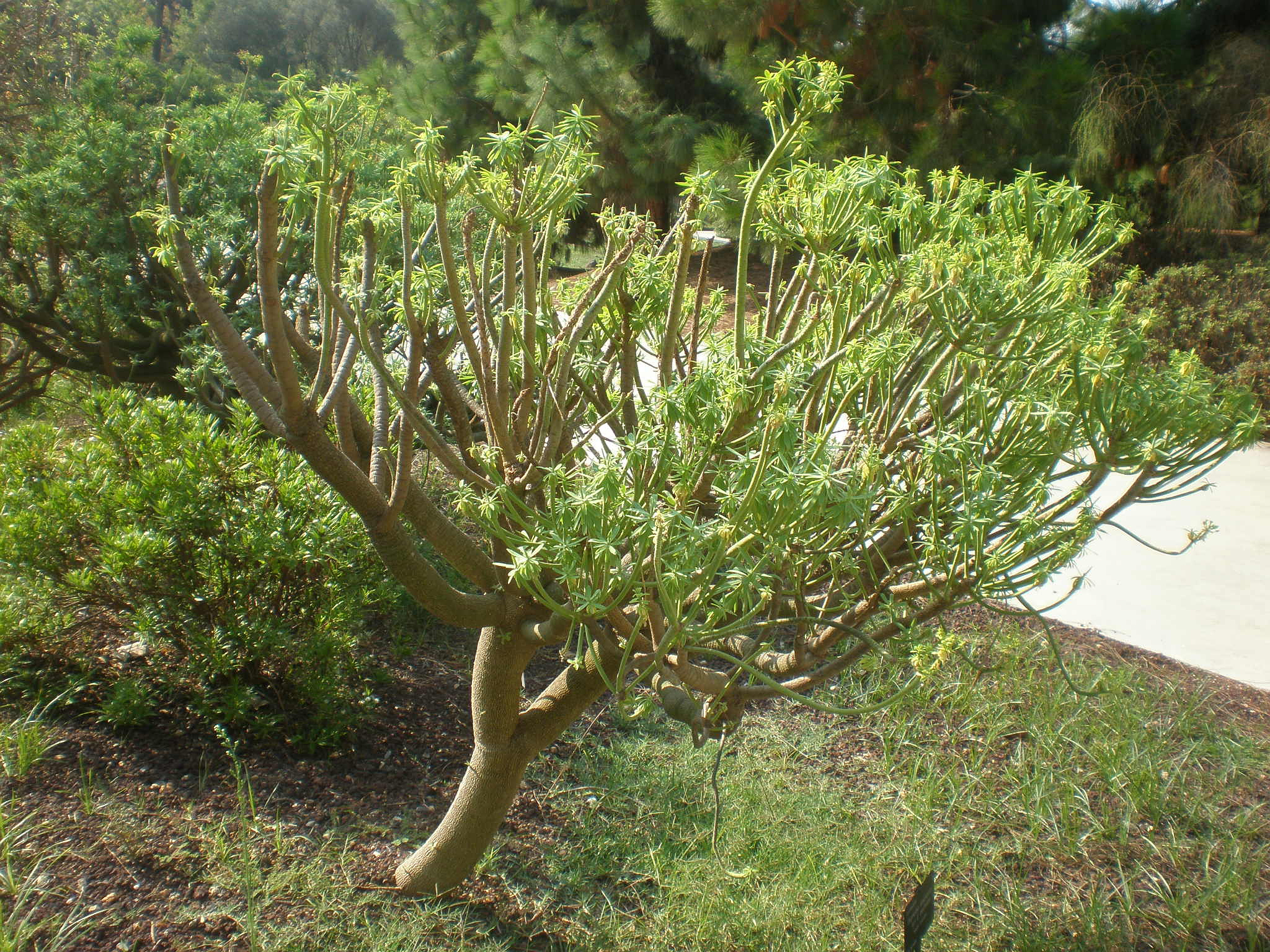
Euphorbia anachoreta is a critically endangered endemic plant species of the Savage Islands

As a consequence of limited introduction, the terrestrial flora has an outstanding interest. More than 100 species of indigenous plants have been catalogued (most creeping plants and bushes). These plants are similar in many respects to indigenous species on the islands of Madeira and the Canaries, which are better suited to dry arid environments. Germination of these species occurs immediately and briefly after annual showers, and include: Lotus glaucus subsp. salvagensis, Scilla madeirensis, Monizia edulis, Erysimum arbuscula, Misopates salvagense, Urtica portosanctana, Asparagus nesiotes, Autonoe madeirensis, among others.

Some endemic species to the archipelago include: Argyranthemum thalassophilum, Monanthes lowei and Euphorbia anachoreta and 2 subspecies of Lobularia canariensis.

Selvagem Pequena and the Fora Islet are the richest floral repositories, since they were never populated by non-indigenous animals or plants. For a period, some indigenous species (primarily Roccella tinctoria and other lichens) were harvested from the islands to support the dye industry of Europe, primarily to England and Flanders in the 15th and 16th centuries, but these adventures were discontinued later.

== History ==
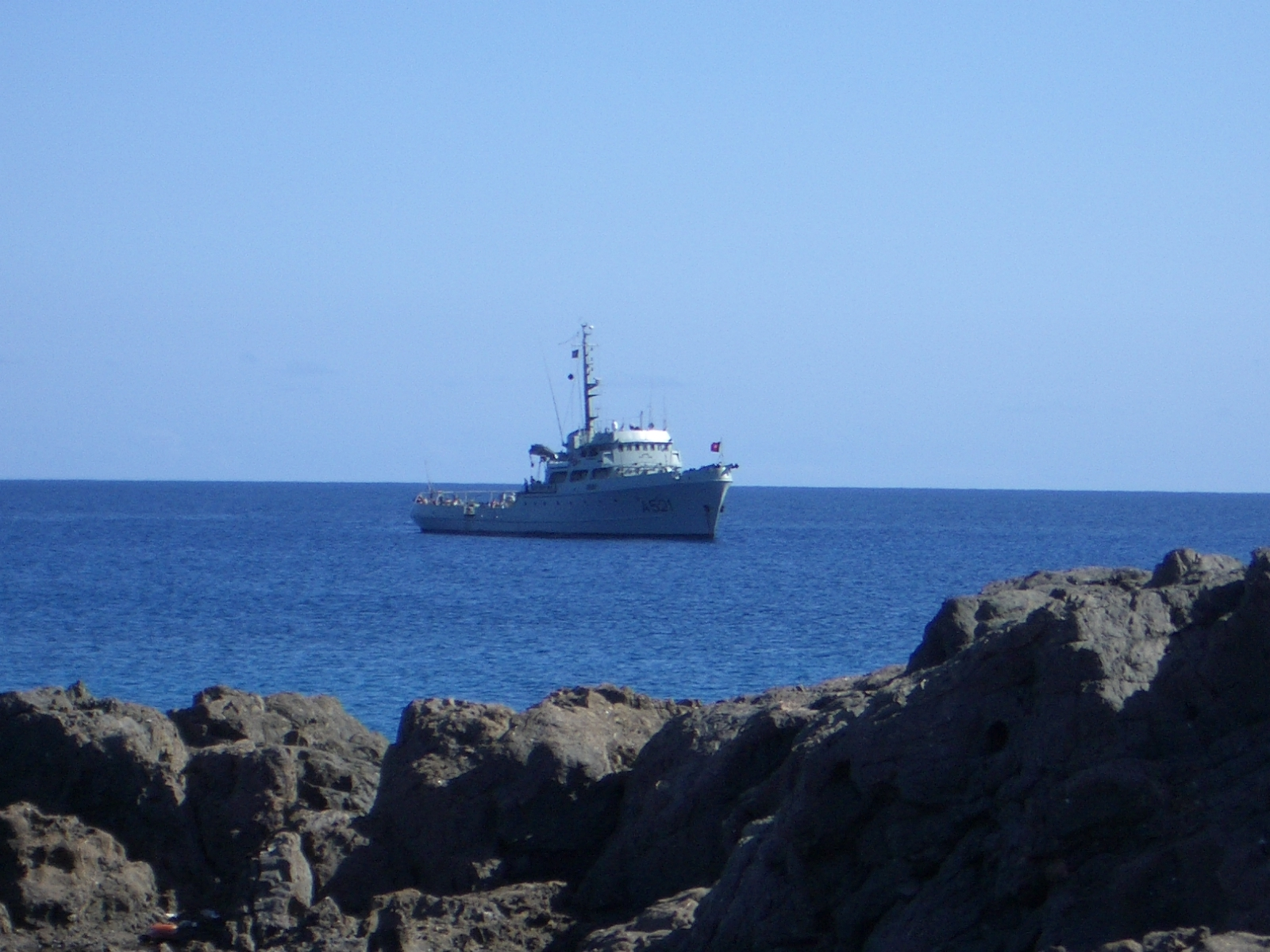
The Portuguese Navy ship NRP Schultz Xavier anchored near the island of Selvagem Pequena

Diogo Gomes de Sintra discovered the islands by chance in 1438. Although the Canary Islands had been inhabited by the Guanches, humans are not known to ever have set foot on the Madeira archipelago or the Savage Islands before the Portuguese discoveries and expansion. Consequently, this island group presented itself to Portuguese navigators uninhabited.

The first attempted settlement of the islands was made around 1438 by the Portuguese, although few details remain of this endeavour. The oldest extant description of the colonisation was written around 1463 by the Portuguese mariner Diogo Gomes de Sintra. Gomes wrote that the islands were used to collect ursella, as a base for red paint/dyes; ursella referred to the lichens of the scientific families Roccellaceae and Parmeliaceae. In those days, the islands of the Atlantic (the Azores and Madeira) belonged to Henry the Navigator, the Grandmaster of the Order of Christ (the Portuguese successor to the Knights Templar in Portugal). However, the islands were generally omitted from the lists of their possessions.

By the 16th century the Savage Islands were held by a family from Madeira, known as Teixeiras Caiados. How the islands found themselves under Caiados control is unknown. In 1560 they were given to João Cabral de Noronha. After 1717 they are recorded in wills, inheritances, inventories and other documents. Between 1774 and 1831 taxes were paid to the king. The islands were also recorded in the books of the Conservatória do Registo Predial of Funchal.

From the 15th to the 19th centuries, the islands were used for different economic activities, such as collecting barilla weed and shells and mollusks. The islands, although uninhabited, were also used as a waypoint for fishing, while goats and rabbits were hunted on Selvagem Grande. Until about 1967, in September or October, there were organised hunts for the chicks of the Cory's shearwaters for their oil and meat.

The islands have a reputation as pirate treasure islands, and there are many stories of treasure hunting. According to reliable primary documents, at least four times (in 1813, 1851, 1856 and 1948), serious dig attempts were made to recover the supposed treasures but nothing was found.

In 1904 the islands were sold to Luís Rocha Machado. The Permanent Commission of International Maritime Law gave sovereignty of the Savage Islands to Portugal on 15 February 1938.

In 1959, the World Wildlife Fund (WWF), now known as the World Wide Fund for Nature, became interested in the islands and signed a contract/promise with the owner, Luís Rocha Machado. In 1971 the Portuguese government intervened and acquired the islands, converting them into a nature reserve. The Savage Islands Reserve was created as part of the Madeira Nature Park; it is one of the oldest nature reserves of Portugal and it also includes the surrounding shelf to a depth of 200 metres (220 yd; 660 ft). In 1976, permanent surveillance began, and in 1978 the reserve was elevated to the status of Nature Reserve. In 2002, part of the nature reserve was nominated for UNESCO's list of World Heritage Sites: they are currently included in the tentative World Heritage Site list.

In the 21st century, the Savage Islands have a permanent team of wardens from Madeira Nature Reserve (on Selvagem Grande there is a permanent research station with two wardens year-round, while Selvagem Pequena is staffed usually by two wardens between May and October). These and the Zino family (a family of British origin, known as "the guardians of the Savages") are the only permanent human inhabitants of the islands. Selvagem Grande gained a weather station controlled by IPMA (the Portuguese Institute of the Sea and the Atmosphere) and is permanently patrolled by the Portuguese Maritime Police to improve safety in navigation and search and rescue, and to prevent pollution and stop illegal fisheries in the reserve.

=== Disputed territory ===
Portugal places its southernmost exclusive economic zone claim south of the Selvagem Islands. Spain formerly objected to it on the basis that the Selvagem Islands do not have a separate continental shelf, stating that the border should comprise an equidistant line drawn halfway between Madeira and the Canaries. According to article 121 of the United Nations Convention on the Law of the Sea: "Rocks which cannot sustain human habitation or economic life of their own shall have no exclusive economic zone or continental shelf." The status of the Savage Islands as islands or rocks was thus at the core of the dispute.

Despite the islands having numerous visitors, mostly for scientific purposes, and the fact that several settlements were tried throughout the centuries, today the Savage Islands are a special natural reserve whose only year-round inhabitants are the wardens of Madeira's Natural Park. Over the years, apart from the EEZ debate, a number of issues pertaining to the Savage Islands led to disputes between the two countries, namely the construction of a lighthouse, the administration of airspace (done from the closer Canary Islands), the right to perform military air exercises, and, most importantly, illegal fishing and poaching in the archipelago and its vicinity. In order to further protect the Savage Islands as a Natural Reserve, more stringent legislation was established in 2025. This gives the Madeira regional government authority to monitor wildlife, reintroduce and repopulate areas with native exotic species, control and remove invasive flora or fauna, apprehend illegal fishing vessels and crews, or poachers caught in the islands or within their jurisdiction.

==== 19th century ====
- 1880s – In an 1881 Maritime Signalisation Commission meeting, Spain requested the building of a lighthouse on the islands. The Portuguese recognised the importance of the lighthouse to the Canary Islands sea route, but deemed it not a priority at the time. In response, the Spanish Foreign Affairs Ministry stated that "the sovereignty of the islands is unclear".

==== 20th century ====
- 1910s – In 1911, given the lack of action over the requested lighthouse, Spain said it would build it on its own, leading to Portuguese fears of a Spanish annexation of the strategic islands. After a Portuguese protest questioning what it termed "Spanish confusion" over the issue, Spain said its intention was to reach an agreement "in the most amicable terms". In 1913, the Portuguese Navy conducted a survey, led by Admiral Schultz Xavier, of the Selvagem Grande Island and recommended Pico da Atalaia as the best location for the lighthouse.
- 1930s – On February 15, 1938, the Permanent Commission of International Maritime Law declared Portugal as the legitimate sovereign over the islands. The Spanish government, however, was in the midst of fighting the Spanish Civil War and did not have the opportunity to present its case to the commission.
- 1970s – In 1971, the Portuguese government bought the islands from their previous Madeiran owner, and decreed the creation of a natural reserve in the archipelago to protect the area from illegal fishing and poaching, which had severely reduced the bird populations in recent years. In 1972, two Spanish civilian boats, San Pedro de Abona and Áries, were arrested near the islands. In 1975, fishermen from the Canary Islands disembarked in the islands and waved a Spanish flag. In 1976 another Spanish boat, Ecce Homo Divino, was detained for illegal fishing.
- 1996-1997 – On 8 April 1996, Spanish Air Force F-18 fighters overflew the islands, followed by a low altitude Puma SA-330J flyby over Selvagem Grande on August 2. On the following October 16th, another F-18 flyby over the reserve was filmed by the Portuguese RTP TV channel, prompting the Portuguese Foreign Affairs Ministry to protest. In May 1997, the Ministry of Defense formally requested the Spanish government to stop training exercises near the natural reserve. Spain agreed, but on 1 August 1997 and 24 September 1997, new flybys by Spanish airplanes took place in the vicinity, prompting vehement protests from the Portuguese authorities which led to a formal apology by the Spanish ambassador to Portugal, after which the flights stopped. After this period, the islands were reinforced with a small Portuguese Navy detachment, purportedly to help patrol the islands against illegal fishing and poaching. Later in 1997, Spain formally recognised Portuguese sovereignty over the islands.

==== 21st century ====
- 2005 – 23 June, four Spanish fishing boats were detained 28 nautical miles (52 km; 32 mi) south of the islands. A few days later, on 8 July, a biologist and one of the nature reserve wardens in the Selvagem Grande Island were threatened with a knife and underwater fishing spear guns by a group of Spanish fishermen. A group of ten Portuguese marines were placed on the island for a month to put an end to poaching of protected species.
- 2007 – June, one Spanish search and rescue airplane flew over the islands at low altitude, prompting the Portuguese Ministry of the Environment to contact its Spanish counterpart over the issue.
- 2013 – 5 July, Spain sends letter officially complaining to the UN that the Savage islands are just rocks, which would invalidate the Portuguese sovereignty over the claimed EEZ surrounding the islands.
- 2013 – 18 July, The serving President of Portugal, Aníbal Cavaco Silva with the President of the Regional Government of Madeira, Alberto João Jardim arrived on the islands on board the Portuguese Navy frigate Vasco da Gama visit and stay on the Islands as part of a tour to meet residents and officials based there. Silva became the first president to stay overnight on the islands as former Presidents Mário Soares and Jorge Sampaio only visited for a few hours.
- 2014 – The head of the Spanish Government, Mariano Rajoy, announced that Repsol, an Oil and Gas company will conduct surveys to find oil and gas in the surrounding waters of the nearby Canary Islands, would begin "very likely" between July and September.
- 2014 – 22 September, Canarian secessionists on behalf of the Canarian Nationalist Alternative party, staged a protest on the smaller island of Selvagem Pequena, to urge the Portuguese government to intercede with the European Parliament so as not to jeopardise the fragile and unique biodiversity of the Macaronesian islands, before the Spanish government completely surrenders to the interests of Repsol. After two days the protestors were transported to Funchal by the Portuguese Navy.
- 2014 – 17 December, Spain sends Dr Luis Somoza Losada to the UN to give a 448-point report asking for the expansion of Spanish territory at the expense of Portugal. After returning to Spain from New York he states "It's the biggest enlargement of Spanish sovereignty since Christopher Columbus". Luis Somoza Losada was a coordinator of a team made up of civilians and military that was commissioned to underpin the ambitious maritime expansion of Spain around the Savage Islands. Conducting 6 surveys of the area on 3 ships: the Hespérides, Miguel Oliver and Sarmiento de Gamboa, he discovered that there was gas in the area and possibly oil.
- 2016 – 21 August, the territory starts being permanently patrolled by two elements of the Polícia Marítima, the Portuguese water police, stationed on the Selvagem Grande Island.
- 2016 – 30 August, Portuguese President Marcelo Rebelo de Sousa, joined by the Minister for Internal Administration Constança Urbano de Sousa, and the President of the Regional Government of Madeira Miguel Albuquerque, visited Selvagem Grande. Rebelo de Sousa remarked that "Wherever the President of the Republic goes, he marks our territory", and justified the voyage by saying that the Head of State must go to every part of the national territory.

== See also ==
- Exclusive economic zone of Portugal
- Autonomous Region of Madeira
- List of islands of Portugal
- Macaronesia
