= List of non-marine molluscs of the Canary Islands =

Location of the Canary Islands with the Spain highlighted.

The topography of Canary Islands include islands Tenerife, Gran Canaria, Lanzarote, La Palma, La Gomera, El Hierro and Fuerteventura.

The non-marine molluscs of the Canary Islands are a part of the molluscan fauna of the Canary Islands.

A number of species of non-marine molluscs are found in the wild in Canary Islands.

== Freshwater gastropods ==
Hydrobiidae

- Pseudamnicola canariensis Glöer & Reuselaars, 2020 - endemic to Gran Canaria

Thiaridae

- Melanoides tuberculatus (O. F. Müller, 1774)

Lymnaeidae

- Galba truncatula (O. F. Müller, 1774) - probably non-indigenous
- Pseudosuccinea columella (Say, 1817)

Physidae

- Physella acuta (Draparnaud, 1805) - probably non-indigenous

Planorbidae

- Ancylus striatus Quoy & Gaimard, 1833 - endemic to the Canary Islands
- Gyraulus clymene (Shuttleworth, 1852) - endemic to La Palma and Tenerife
- Planorbella duryi (Wetherby, 1879) - non-indigenous
- Planorbis moquini Requien, 1848

== Land gastropods ==
Hydrocenidae

- Hydrocena gutta Shuttleworth, 1852

Craspedopomatidae

- Craspedopoma costatum (Shuttleworth, 1852) - endemic to the Canary Islands

Pomatiidae

- Pomatias canariensis (d´Orbigny, 1840) - endemic to the Canary Islands
- Pomatias laevigatus (Webb & Berthelot, 1833) - endemic to Tenerife
- Pomatias lanzarotensis (Wollaston, 1878) - endemic to Lanzarote
- Pomatias palmensis (Wollaston, 1878) - endemic to La Palma
- Pomatias raricosta (Wollaston, 1878) - endemic to Tenerife

Cochlicopidae

- Cochlicopa lubricella (Rossmässler, 1834)

Chondrinidae

- Granopupa granum (Draparnaud, 1801) - probably non-indigenous

Lauriidae

- Lauria cylindracea (Da Costa, 1778)
- Lauria fanalensis (R. T. Lowe, 1852)
- Lauria gomerensis D.T. Holyoak & G.A. Holyoak, 2009
- Leiostyla castanea (Shuttleworth, 1852) - endemic to Tenerife
- Leiostyla taeniata (Shuttleworth, 1852) - endemic to the Canary Islands

Pupillidae

- Pupoides orzolae Gittenberger & Ripken, 1985 - endemic to Lanzarote

Truncatellinidae

- Columella microspora (R. T. Lowe, 1852)
- Truncatellina atomus (Shuttleworth, 1852) - endemic to the Canary Islands
- Truncatellina purpuraria Hutterer & Groh, 1993 - endemic to Fuerteventura & Lanzarote

Valloniidae

- Acanthinula spinifera (Mousson, 1872) - endemic to La Palma and Gran Canaria
- Plagyrona placida (Shuttleworth, 1852)
- Vallonia costata (O. F. Müller, 1774) - probably non-indigenous
- Vallonia pulchella (O. F Müller, 1774) - probably non-indigenous

Enidae

- Napaeus alucensis Santana & Yanes, 2011 - endemic to La Gomera
- Napaeus anaga (Grasset, 1857) - endemic to Tenerife
- Napaeus arinagaensis Artiles, Deniz & Martín, 2011 - endemic to Gran Canaria
- Napaeus avaloensis Groh, 2006 - endemic to La Gomera
- Napaeus badiosus (Webb & Berthelot, 1833) - endemic to Tenerife
- Napaeus baeticatus (Webb & Berthelot, 1833) - endemic to Tenerife
- Napaeus bajamarensis Ibáñez & Alonso, 2009 - endemic to Tenerife
- Napaeus barquini Alonso & Ibáñez, 2006 - endemic to La Gomera
- Napaeus bechi Alonso & Ibáñez, 1993 - endemic to Tenerife
- Napaeus beguirae Henríquez, 1995 - endemic to La Gomera
- Napaeus bertheloti (Pfeiffer, 1846) - endemic to La Gomera
- Napaeus boucheti Alonso & Ibáñez, 1993 - endemic to La Palma
- Napaeus chrysaloides (Wollaston, 1878) - endemic to Gran Canaria
- Napaeus consecoanus (Mousson, 1872) - endemic to La Gomera
- Napaeus delicatus Alonso, Yanes & Ibáñez, 2011 - endemic to La Palma
- Napaeus doliolum Henríquez, 1993 - endemic to Tenerife
- Napaeus elegans Alonso & Ibáñez, 1995 - endemic to Tenerife
- Napaeus encaustus (Shuttleworth, 1852) - endemic to La Palma
- Napaeus esbeltus Ibáñez & Alonso, 1995 - endemic to Tenerife
- Napaeus exilis Henríquez, 1995 - endemic to Gran Canaria
- Napaeus flavoterminatus (Wollaston, 1878) - endemic to Tenerife
- Napaeus gomerensis G. A. Holyoak & D. T. Holyoak, 2011 - endemic to La Gomera
- Napaeus grohi Alonso, Ibáñez & Santana, 2011 - endemic to El Hierro
- Napaeus gruereanus (Grasset, 1857) - endemic to El Hierro
- Napaeus halmyris (J. Mabille, 1883) - endemic to Tenerife
- Napaeus helvolus (Webb & Berthelot, 1833) - endemic to Tenerife
- Napaeus huttereri Henríquez, 1991 - endemic to Lanzarote
- Napaeus indifferens (Mousson, 1872) - endemic to Gran Canaria
- Napaeus inflatiusculus (Wollaston, 1878) - endemic to La Gomera
- Napaeus interpunctatus (Wollaston, 1878) - endemic to Gran Canaria
- Napaeus isletae Groh & Ibáñez, 1992 - endemic to Gran Canaria
- Napaeus josei Santana, Alonso & Ibáñez, 2011 - endemic to Gran Canaria
- Napaeus lajaensis Castillo, Yanes, Alonso & Ibáñez, 2006 - endemic to Tenerife
- Napaeus lichenicola Ibáñez & Alonso, 2007 - endemic to Fuerteventura
- Napaeus lowei (Wollaston, 1878) - endemic to Tenerife
- Napaeus maculatus Goodacre, 2006 - endemic to La Gomera
- Napaeus maffioteanus (Mousson, 1872) - endemic to Gran Canaria
- Napaeus minimus D.T. Holyoak & G.A. Holyoak, 2011 - endemic to La Gomera
- Napaeus moroi Martín, Alonso & Ibáñez, 2011 - endemic to La Gomera
- Napaeus moquinianus (Webb & Berthelot, 1833) - endemic to Gran Canaria
- Napaeus myosotis (Webb & Berthelot, 1833) - endemic to Gran Canaria
- Napaeus nanodes (Shuttleworth, 1852) - endemic to Tenerife
- Napaeus obesatus (Webb & Berthelot, 1833) - endemic to Gran Canaria
- Napaeus ocellatus (Mousson, 1872) - endemic to El Hierro
- Napaeus orientalis Henríquez, 1995 - endemic to La Gomera
- Napaeus ornamentatus Moro, 2009 - endemic to La Gomera
- Napaeus osoriensis (Wollaston, 1878) - endemic to Gran Canaria
- Napaeus palmaensis (Mousson, 1872) - endemic to La Palma
- Napaeus procerus Emerson, 2006 - endemic to La Gomera
- Napaeus propinquus (Shuttleworth, 1852) - endemic to Tenerife
- Napaeus pygmaeus Ibáñez & Alonso, 1993 - endemic to La Gomera
- Napaeus roccellicola (Webb & Berthelot, 1833) - endemic to Tenerife
- Napaeus rufobrunneus (Wollaston, 1878) - endemic to Lanzarote
- Napaeus rupicola (Mousson, 1872) - endemic to La Gomera
- Napaeus savinosa (Wollaston, 1878) - endemic to El Hierro
- Napaeus servus (Mousson, 1872) - endemic to La Gomera
- Napaeus severus (J. Mabille, 1898) - endemic to La Gomera
- Napaeus subgracilior (Wollaston, 1878) - endemic to La Palma
- Napaeus subsimplex (Wollaston, 1878) - endemic to El Hierro
- Napaeus tabidus (Shuttleworth, 1852) - endemic to Tenerife
- Napaeus tafadaensis Yanes, 2009 - endemic to Tenerife
- Napaeus tagamichensis Henríquez, 1993 - endemic to La Gomera
- Napaeus taguluchensis Henríquez, 1993 - endemic to La Gomera
- Napaeus tenoensis Henríquez, 1993 - endemic to Tenerife
- Napaeus teobaldoi Martín, 2009 - endemic to Tenerife
- Napaeus texturatus (Mousson, 1872) - endemic to La Gomera
- Napaeus torilensis Artiles & Deniz, 2011 - endemic to La Gomera
- Napaeus validoi Santana, Alonso & Ibáñez, 2011 - endemic to Gran Canaria
- Napaeus variatus (Webb & Berthelot, 1833) - endemic to Tenerife
- Napaeus venegueraensis Artiles, Santana & Deniz, 2011 - endemic to Gran Canaria
- Napaeus voggenreiteri Hutterer, 2006 - endemic to La Gomera

Achatinidae

- Rumina decollata (Linnaeus, 1758)

Ferussaciidae

- Cecilioides acicula (O. F. Müller, 1774) - probably non-indigenous
- Ferussacia attenuata (Mousson, 1872) - endemic to Lanzarote
- Ferussacia folliculus (Gmelin, 1791) - probably non-indigenous
- Ferussacia fritschi (Mousson, 1872) - endemic to Lanzarote
- Ferussacia lanzarotensis (Mousson, 1872) - endemic to Lanzarote
- Ferussacia submajor (Wollaston, 1878) - endemic to Fuerteventura
- Ferussacia tumidula (Wollaston, 1878) - endemic to Lanzarote
- Ferussacia valida (Mousson, 1872) - endemic to Fuerteventura
- Ferussacia vitrea (Webb & Berthelot, 1833) - endemic to Fuerteventura and Lanzarote
- Sculptiferussacia clausiliaeformis Alonso & Ibáñez, 1992 - endemic to Fuerteventura

Streptaxidae

- Gibbulinella dealbata (Webb & Berthelot, 1833) - endemic to the Canary Islands
- Gibbulinella dewinteri Bank, Groh & Ripken, 2002 - endemic to the Canary Islands
- Gibbulinella macrogira (Mousson, 1872) - endemic to La Gomera

Testacellidae

- Testacella maugei A. Férussac, 1819 - probably non-indigenous on Tenerife and Gran Canaria
- Testacella scutulum G. B. Sowerby, 1821 - probably non-indigenous on Gran Canaria

Discidae

- Canaridiscus anagaensis (Ibáñez & D. T. Holyoak, 2011) - endemic to Tenerife
- Canaridiscus engonatus (Shuttleworth, 1852) - globally extinct, was endemic to Tenerife
- Canaridiscus ganodus (J. Mabille, 1882) - endemic to La Gomera
- Canaridiscus gomerensis (Rähle, 1994) - endemic to La Gomera
- Canaridiscus kompsus (J. Mabille, 1883) - endemic to El Hierro
- Canaridiscus laurisilvae (Allgaier & M. Klemm, 2012)
- Canaridiscus putrescens (R. T. Lowe, 1861) - endemic to La Palma
- Canaridiscus retextus (Shuttleworth, 1852) - globally extinct, was endemic to La Palma
- Canaridiscus rupivagus (Rähle & Allgaier, 2011)
- Canaridiscus saproxylophagus (M. R. Alonso, G. A. Holyoak & Yanes, 2011) - endemic to La Gomera
- Canaridiscus scutulus (Shuttleworth, 1852) - endemic to Tenerife
- Canaridiscus textilis (Shuttleworth, 1852) - globally extinct, was endemic to La Palma

Punctidae

- Paralaoma servilis (Shuttleworth, 1852)
- Punctum pygmaeum (Draparnaud, 1801)

Gastrodontidae

- Janulus pompylius (Shuttleworth, 1852) - globally extinct, was endemic to La Palma
- Janulus traviesus Castro, Yanes, García, Alonso & Ibáñez, 2014 - endemic to La Palma
- Vermetum festinans (Shuttleworth, 1852) - endemic to La Palma
- Vermetum tamadabaensis D.T. Holyoak, G.A. Holyoak, Yanes, Santana, García, Castro, Artiles, Alonso & Ibáñez, 2014 - endemic to Gran Canaria
- Zonitoides arboreus (Say, 1817) - non-indigenous on Tenerife

Oxychilidae

- Mediterranea hydatina (Rossmässler, 1838) - probably non-indigenous on Tenerife
- Oxychilus alliarius (Miller, 1822) - non-indigenous on Tenerife since 2009
- Oxychilus cellarius (O. F. Müller, 1774) - probably non-indigenous
- Oxychilus draparnaudi (Beck, 1837) - probably non-indigenous
- Retinella circumsessa (Shuttleworth, 1852) - endemic to Tenerife
- Retinella hierroensis Alonso & Ibáñez, 2013 - endemic to El Hierro
- Retinella lenis (Shuttleworth, 1852) - endemic to La Palma
- Retinella osoriensis (Wollaston, 1878) - endemic to Gran Canaria
- Retinella rochebruni (J. Mabille, 1882) - endemic to La Gomera

Pristilomatidae

- Hawaiia minuscula (Binney, 1841) - non-indigenous on Tenerife
- Vitrea contracta (Westerlund, 1871)

Milacidae

- Milax gagates (Draparnaud, 1801) - probably non-indigenous
- Milax nigricans - non-indigenous on Tenerife since 2009

Parmacellidae

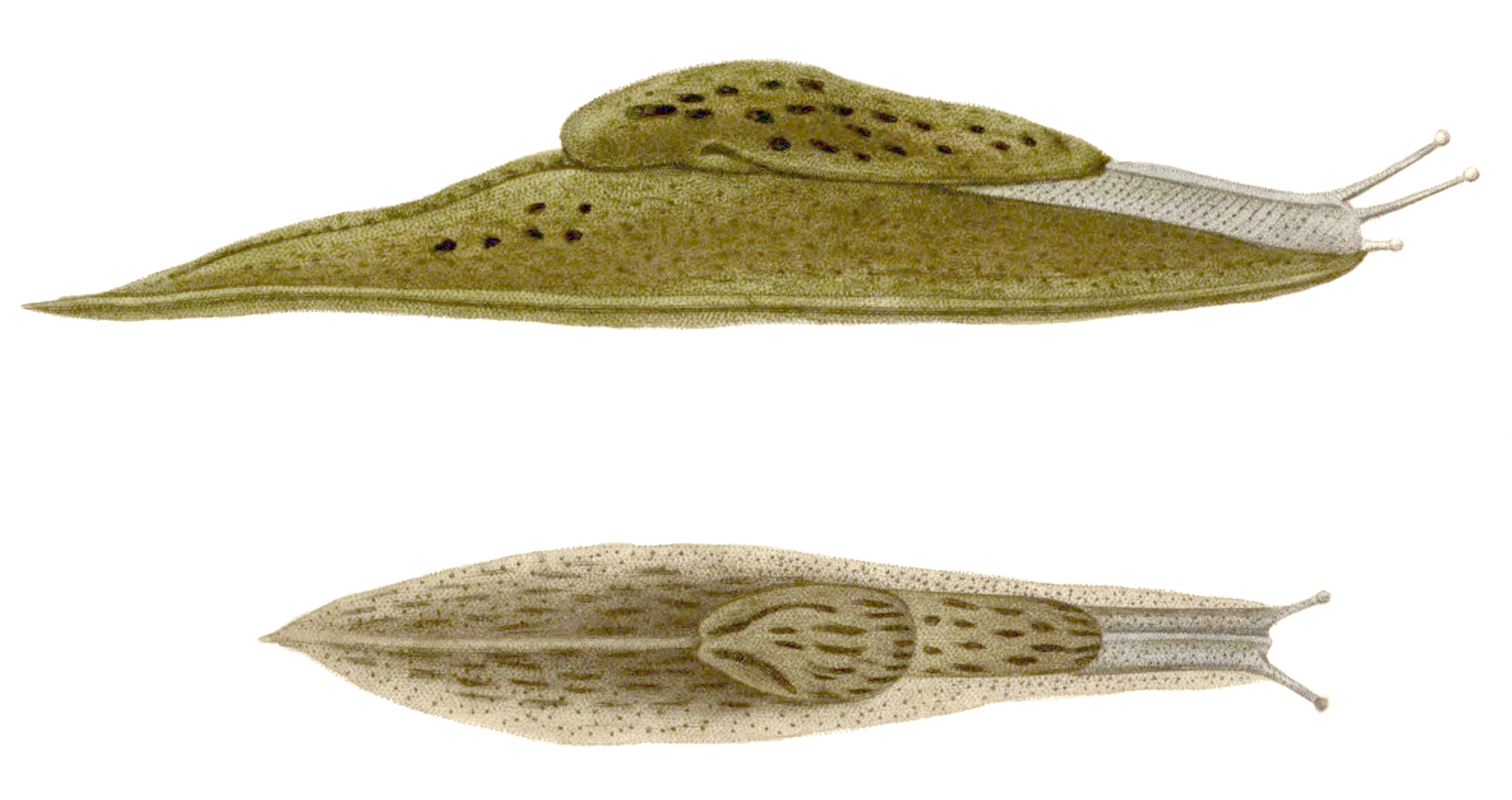
Two views of a live individual of endemic Cryptella canariensis

- Cryptella alegranzae Hutterer & Groh, 1991 - endemic to Lanzarote
- Cryptella auriculata (Mousson, 1872) - endemic to Fuerteventura
- Cryptella canariensis Webb & Berthelot, 1833 - endemic to Fuerteventura and Lanzarote
- Cryptella famarae Hutterer & Groh, 1991 - endemic to Lanzarote
- Cryptella parvula (Hutterer, 1990) - endemic to Fuerteventura and Lanzarote
- Cryptella susannae (Hutterer, 1990) - endemic to Fuerteventura
- Cryptella tamaranensis (Hutterer, 1990) - endemic to Gran Canaria
- Parmacella tenerifensis Alonso, Ibáñez & Díaz, 1985 - endemic to Tenerife, vulnerable or endangered

Agriolimacidae

- Deroceras laeve (O. F. Müller, 1774) - probably non-indigenous
- Deroceras invadens Reise, Hutchinson, Schunack & Schlitt, 2011 - probably non-indigenous
- Deroceras reticulatum (O. F. Müller, 1774) - probably non-indigenous

Boettgerillidae

- Boettgerilla pallens Simroth, 1912

Limacidae

- Limacus flavus (Linnaeus, 1758) - probably non-indigenous
- Ambigolimax parvipenis (Bourguignat, 1861) - probably non-indigenous on Tenerife and La Palma
- Ambigolimax valentianus (A. Férussac, 1822) - probably non-indigenous
- Ambigolimax wiktori Alonso & Ibáñez, 1989 - endemic to Tenerife

Vitrinidae

- Canarivitrina dianae (Valido & M. R. Alonso, 2000) - endemic to La Gomera
- Canarivitrina falcifera (Ibáñez & Groh, 2000) - endemic to La Gomera
- Canarivitrina mascaensis (Morales, 1987) - endemic to Tenerife
- Canarivitrina ripkeni (M. R. Alonso & Ibáñez, 2000) - endemic to La Gomera
- Canarivitrina taburientensis (Groh & Valido, 2000) - endemic to La Palma
- Guerrina christinae Groh, 1993 - endemic to La Gomera
- Guerrina cuticula (Shuttleworth, 1852) - endemic to La Palma and Tenerife
- Insulivitrina blauneri (Shuttleworth, 1852) - endemic to Tenerife
- Insulivitrina canariensis (Mousson, 1872) - endemic to El Hierro
- Insulivitrina eceroensis M. R. Alonso & Ibáñez, 1987 - endemic to El Hierro
- Insulivitrina emmersoni Morales, 1988 - endemic to La Gomera
- Insulivitrina gomerensis M. R. Alonso & Ibáñez, 1988 - endemic to La Gomera
- Insulivitrina lamarckii (A. Férussac, 1821) - endemic to Tenerife
- Insulivitrina machadoi Ibáñez & M. R. Alonso, 1990 - endemic to Gran Canaria
- Insulivitrina nogalesi M. R. Alonso & Ibáñez, 1990 - endemic to Gran Canaria
- Insulivitrina oromii Ibáñez & M. R. Alonso, 1988 - endemic to La Gomera
- Insulivitrina parryi (Gude, 1896) - endemic to Gran Canaria
- Insulivitrina raquelae Valido, Yanes, M. R. Alonso & Ibáñez, 2014
- Insulivitrina reticulata (Mousson, 1872) - endemic to Tenerife
- Insulivitrina solemi (Ibáñez & M. R. Alonso, 2001) - endemic to La Palma
- Insulivitrina tamaranensis Valido, 1990 - endemic to Gran Canaria
- Insulivitrina tuberculata Ibáñez & M. R. Alonso, 1987 - endemic to Tenerife

Arionidae

- Arion hortensis Férussac, 1819 - probably non-indigenous on Lanzarote

Canariellidae

- Canariella bimbachensis Ibáñez & Alonso, 2002 - endemic to El Hierro
- Canariella discobolus (Shuttleworth, 1852) - endemic to La Gomera
- Canariella eutropis (Shuttleworth, 1861) - endemic to Fuerteventura
- Canariella falkneri Alonso, Ibáñez & Ponte- Lira, 2002 - endemic to La Gomera
- Canariella giustii Ibáñez & Alonso, 2006 - endemic to Tenerife
- Canariella gomerae (Wollaston, 1878) - endemic to La Gomera
- Canariella hispidula (Lamarck, 1822) - endemic to Tenerife
  - the taxa Canariella berthelotii (d´Orbigny, 1836), C. fortunata (Shuttleworth, 1852), C. fortunata beata (Wollaston, 1878), C. lanosa (Mousson, 1872) and C. subhispidula (Mousson, 1872) were placed in the synonymy of C. hispidula
- Canariella huttereri Ponte-Lira & Groh, 1994 - endemic to El Hierro
- Canariella jandiaensis Ibáñez & Ponte-Lira, 2006 - endemic to Fuerteventura
- Canariella leprosa (Shuttleworth, 1852) - endemic to Tenerife
- Canariella multigranosa (Mousson, 1872) - endemic to La Gomera
- Canariella planaria (Lamarck, 1822) - endemic to Tenerife
- Canariella plutonia (R.T Lowe, 1861) - endemic to Fuerteventura and Lanzarote
- Canariella pontelirae Hutterer, 1994 - endemic to Tenerife, critically endangered
- Canariella pthonera (Mabille, 1883) - endemic to Tenerife
- Canariella ronceroi Ponte-Lira, 2002 - endemic to La Gomera
- Canariella squamata Alonso, Ibáñez & Ponte- Lira, 2003 - endemic to La Gomera
- Canariella tenuicostulata Alonso, Ibáñez & Ponte-Lira, 2003 - endemic to La Gomera
- Canariella tillieri Alonso, Ibáñez & Ponte-Lira, 2003 - endemic to La Palma

Geomitridae

- Cernuella virgata (Da Costa, 1778) - probably non-indigenous
- Cochlicella barbara (Linnaeus, 1758) - probably non-indigenous
- Keraea garachicoensis (Wollaston, 1878) - globally extinct, it was endemic to Tenerife
- Microxeromagna lowei (Potiez & Michaud, 1835)
- Monilearia arguineguinensis (Seddon & Aparicio, 1998) - endemic to Gran Canaria
- Monilearia caementitia (Shuttleworth, 1852) - endemic to Gran Canaria
- Monilearia granostriata (Mousson, 1857) - endemic to Fuerteventura
- Monilearia loweana (Wollaston, 1878) - endemic to Lanzarote
- Monilearia monilifera (Webb & Berthelot, 1833) - endemic to Fuerteventura and Lanzarote
- Monilearia montigena Bank, Groh & Ripken, 2002 - endemic to Gran Canaria
- Monilearia multipunctata (Mousson, 1872) - endemic to Fuerteventura
- Monilearia oleacea (Shuttleworth, 1852) - endemic to La Palma
- Monilearia persimilis (Shuttleworth, 1852) - endemic to the Canary Islands
- Monilearia phalerata (Webb & Berthelot, 1833) - endemic to Tenerife
- Monilearia praeposita (Mousson, 1872) - endemic to Gran Canaria
- Monilearia pulverulenta (R. T. Lowe, 1861) - endemic to Gran Canaria
- Monilearia tubaeformis M. R. Alonso & Groh, 2006 - endemic to Fuerteventura
- Monilearia tumulorum (Webb & Berthelot, 1833) - endemic to Gran Canaria
- Monilearia watsoniana (Wollaston, 1878) - endemic to Gran Canaria
- Monilearia woodwardia (Mousson, 1872) - endemic to Tenerife
- Obelus despreauxii (d´Orbigny, 1839) - endemic to Gran Canaria
- Obelus discogranulatus Alonso & Groh, 2003 - endemic to Fuerteventura
- Obelus mirandae (Lowe, 1861) - endemic to La Gomera
- Obelus moderatus (Mousson, 1857) - endemic to Fuerteventura
- Obelus moratus (Mousson, 1872) - endemic to Fuerteventura
- Obelus pumilio (Dillwyn, 1817) - endemic to Gran Canaria and Fuerteventura
- Obelus zarzaensis Neiber, Walther, Santana Benítez, Alonso & Ibáñez, 2016 - endemic to Fuerteventura
- Orexana ultima (Mousson, 1872) - endemic to Fuerteventura
- Ripkeniella petrophila (Lowe, 1861) - endemic to La Gomera
- Xerotricha adoptata (Mousson, 1872) - endemic to La Gomera
- Xerotricha apicina (Lamarck, 1822) - probably non-indigenous
- Xerotricha conspurcata (Draparnaud, 1801) - probably non-indigenous
- Xerotricha crispolanata (Wollaston, 1878) - taxonomic status uncertain
- Xerotricha lancerottensis (Webb & Berthelot, 1833) - endemic to Fuerteventura and Lanzarote
- Xerotricha nodosostriata (Mousson, 1872) - taxonomic status uncertain
- Xerotricha nubivaga (Mabille, 1882) - endemic to Tenerife
- Xerotricha orbignii (d'Orbigny, 1836) - endemic to Tenerife
- Xerotricha pavida (Mousson, 1872) - endemic to La Palma

Helicidae

- Cornu aspersum (O. F. Müller, 1774) - probably non-indigenous
- Hemicycla berkeleii (R. T. Lowe, 1861) - endemic to Gran Canaria
- Hemicycla bethencourtiana (Shuttleworth, 1852) - endemic to Tenerife
- Hemicycla bidentalis (Lamarck, 1822) - endemic to Tenerife
  - Hemicycla bidentalis bidentalis (Lamarck, 1822) - endemic to Tenerife
  - Hemicycla bidentalis inaccessibilis Groh, 1988 - endemic to Tenerife
- Hemicycla cardiobola (J. Mabille, 1882) - endemic to Tenerife
- Hemicycla consobrina (A. Férussac, 1821) - endemic to Tenerife
  - Hemicycla consobrina consobrina (A. Férussac, 1821) - endemic to Tenerife
  - Hemicycla consobrina invernicata (Mousson, 1872) - endemic to Tenerife
  - Hemicycla consobrina nivariae (Wollaston, 1878) - endemic to Tenerife
  - Hemicycla consobrina retrodens (Mousson, 1872) - endemic to Tenerife
- Hemicycla desculpta (Mousson, 1872) - endemic to Fuerteventura
- Hemicycla diegoi Neiber, Vega-Luz, Vega-Luz & Koenemann, 2011 - endemic to Tenerife
- Hemicycla digna (Mousson, 1872) - endemic to La Gomera
- Hemicycla distensa (Mousson, 1872) - endemic to La Gomera
- Hemicycla efferata (Mousson, 1872) - endemic to La Gomera
- Hemicycla ethelema (J. Mabille, 1882) - endemic to Gran Canaria
- Hemicycla eurythyra O. Boettger 1908 - endemic to Tenerife
- Hemicycla flavistoma Alonso, Henríquez & Ibáñez, 1991 - endemic to Lanzarote
- Hemicycla fritschi (Mousson, 1872) - endemic to La Gomera
- Hemicycla fulgida Alonso & Ibáñez, 2007 - endemic to Tenerife
- Hemicycla fuenterroquensis Castro, Yanes, Alonso & Ibáñez, 2012 - endemic to La Palma
- Hemicycla gaudryi (d'Orbigny, 1839)) - endemic to Gran Canaria
- Hemicycla glasiana (Shuttleworth, 1852) - endemic to Gran Canaria
- Hemicycla glyceia (J. Mabille, 1882) - endemic to Tenerife
  - Hemicycla glyceia glyceia (J. Mabille, 1882) - endemic to Tenerife
  - Hemicycla glyceia silensis Cavero, 1988 - endemic to Tenerife
- Hemicycla gomerensis (Morelet, 1864) - endemic to La Gomera
- Hemicycla granomalleata (Wollaston, 1878) - endemic to La Palma
- Hemicycla guamartemes (Grasset, 1857) - endemic to Gran Canaria
- Hemicycla hedybia (J. Mabille, 1882) - endemic to La Gomera
- Hemicycla incisogranulata (Mousson, 1872) - endemic to Tenerife
- Hemicycla inutilis (Mousson, 1872) - endemic to Tenerife
- Hemicycla laurijona Alonso & Ibanez, 2007 - endemic to La Gomera
- Hemicycla mascaensis Alonso & Ibáñez, 1988 - endemic to Tenerife
- Hemicycla maugeana (Shuttleworth, 1852) - endemic to El Hierro
- Hemicycla merita (Mousson, 1872) - endemic to La Gomera
- Hemicycla melchori Vega-Luz & Vega-Luz, 2008 - endemic to Tenerife
- Hemicycla modesta (Férussac, 1821) - endemic to Tenerife
- Hemicycla montefortiana Beck & Rähle, 2006 - endemic to La Gomera
- Hemicycla moussoniana (Wollaston, 1878) - endemic to La Gomera
- Hemicycla paeteliana (L. Pfeiffer, 1859) - endemic to Fuerteventura
- Hemicycla paivanopsis (J. Mabille, 1882) - endemic to La Gomera
- Hemicycla perraudierei (Grasset, 1857) - endemic to El Hierro
- Hemicycla perrieri (J. Mabille, 1882) - endemic to Tenerife
- Hemicycla planorbella (Lamarck, 1816) - endemic to La Gomera
- Hemicycla plicaria (Lamarck, 1816) - endemic to Tenerife
- Hemicycla pouchadan Ibáñez & Alonso, 2007 - endemic to Tenerife
- Hemicycla pouchet (A. Férussac, 1821) - endemic to Tenerife
- Hemicycla psathyra (R. T. Lowe, 1861) - endemic to Gran Canaria
  - Hemicycla psathyra bituminosa (J. Mabille, 1883) - endemic to Gran Canaria
  - Hemicycla psathyra psathyra (R. T. Lowe, 1861) - endemic to Gran Canaria
  - Hemicycla psathyra temperata (Mousson, 1872) - endemic to Gran Canaria
- Hemicycla quadricincta (Morelet, 1864) - endemic to La Gomera
  - Hemicycla quadricincta quadricincta (Morelet, 1864) - endemic to La Gomera
  - Hemicycla quadricincta subaucta (Wollaston, 1878) - endemic to La Gomera
- Hemicycla saponacea (R. T. Lowe, 1861) - endemic to Gran Canaria
- Hemicycla sarcostoma (Webb & Berthelot, 1833) - endemic to Fuerteventura and Lanzarote
- Hemicycla saulcyi (d´Orbigny, 1839) - endemic to Gran Canaria
  - Hemicycla saulcyi carta (J. Mabille, 1882) - endemic to Gran Canaria
  - Hemicycla saulcyi saulcyi (d´Orbigny, 1839) - endemic to Gran Canaria
- Hemicycla vermiplicata (Wollaston, 1878) - endemic to La Palma
- Otala lactea (O. F. Müller, 1774) - probably non-indigenous
- Theba arinagae Gittenberger & Ripken, 1987 - endemic to the Canary Islands
- Theba clausoinflata (Mousson, 1857) - endemic to Fuerteventura
- Theba costillae Hutterer, 1990 - endemic to Fuerteventura
- Theba geminata (Mousson, 1857) - endemic to the Canary Islands
- Theba grasseti (Mousson, 1872) - endemic to Gran Canaria
- Theba impugnata (Mousson, 1857) - endemic to Fuerteventura and Lanzarote
- Theba orzolae Gittenberger & Ripken, 1985 - endemic to Lanzarote
- Theba pisana (O. F. Müller, 1774) - probably non-indigenous

Trissexodontidae

- Caracollina lenticula (Michaud, 1831)

== Freshwater bivalves ==
Sphaeriidae

- Pisidium casertanum (Poli, 1791)

== See also ==
- Macaronesia ecoregion

Lists of molluscs of surrounding countries:

- List of non-marine molluscs of Madeira
- List of non-marine molluscs of Spain
- List of non-marine molluscs of Portugal
- List of non-marine molluscs of Morocco
- Wildlife of Western Sahara
