= Craspedopoma lyonnetianum =

Conservation status
- Endangered (IUCN 3.1)

Scientific classification
- Kingdom: Animalia
- Phylum: Mollusca
- Class: Gastropoda
- Subclass: Caenogastropoda
- Order: Architaenioglossa
- Family: Craspedopomatidae
- Genus: Craspedopoma
- Species: C. lyonnetianum

Binomial name
- Craspedopoma lyonnetianum Lowe, 1852

Species of gastropod

Craspedopoma lyonnetianum is a species of tropical land snails with an operculum, terrestrial gastropod mollusks in the family Craspedopomatidae.

This species is endemic to Madeira, Portugal.
