= Craspedopoma hespericum =

Conservation status
- Least Concern (IUCN 3.1)

Scientific classification
- Kingdom: Animalia
- Phylum: Mollusca
- Class: Gastropoda
- Subclass: Caenogastropoda
- Order: Architaenioglossa
- Family: Craspedopomatidae
- Genus: Craspedopoma
- Species: C. hespericum

Binomial name
- Craspedopoma hespericum Morelet & Drouët, 1857

Species of gastropod

Craspedopoma hespericum is a species of tropical land snails with an operculum, terrestrial gastropod mollusks in the family Craspedopomatidae. This species is endemic to Portugal.
