= Desert Uniforms, Patches, and Insignia of the US Armed Forces =

2016 reference book

- Author: Kevin M. Born; Alexander F. Barnes
- Language: English
- Publisher: Schiffer Military History
- Publication date: January 28, 2017
- Publication place: United States
- Media type: Print
- Pages: 344
- ISBN: 978-0764352065

Desert Uniforms, Patches, and Insignia of the US Armed Forces is a reference book written by Alexander F. Barnes and Kevin M. Born. The book provides a detailed record of the uniforms, patches, and insignia worn by the United States armed forces in combat from the Gulf War through the Iraq and Afghanistan Wars (1990-1991, 2003-2011 and 2001-2021, respectively).

== Content ==
The book includes over 1,000 photographs and covers desert uniforms and patches of the U.S. Army, Navy, Air Force, Marine Corps and Coast Guard. It serves as a reference for veterans, historians, readers, collectors and individuals interested in military reenactment.

== Reception ==
The March 2017 issue of the Military Trader Magazine stated that the book was the "definitive" volume for collectors.

The Trading Post, the quarterly journal of the American Society of Military Insignia Collectors, described the book as an "invaluable guide to the collector."

The Fort Lee Traveler Newspaper reported, "In preparation for the book, [the authors] accumulated more than 1,000 government-and theatre-made desert patches and over 300 uniforms."
