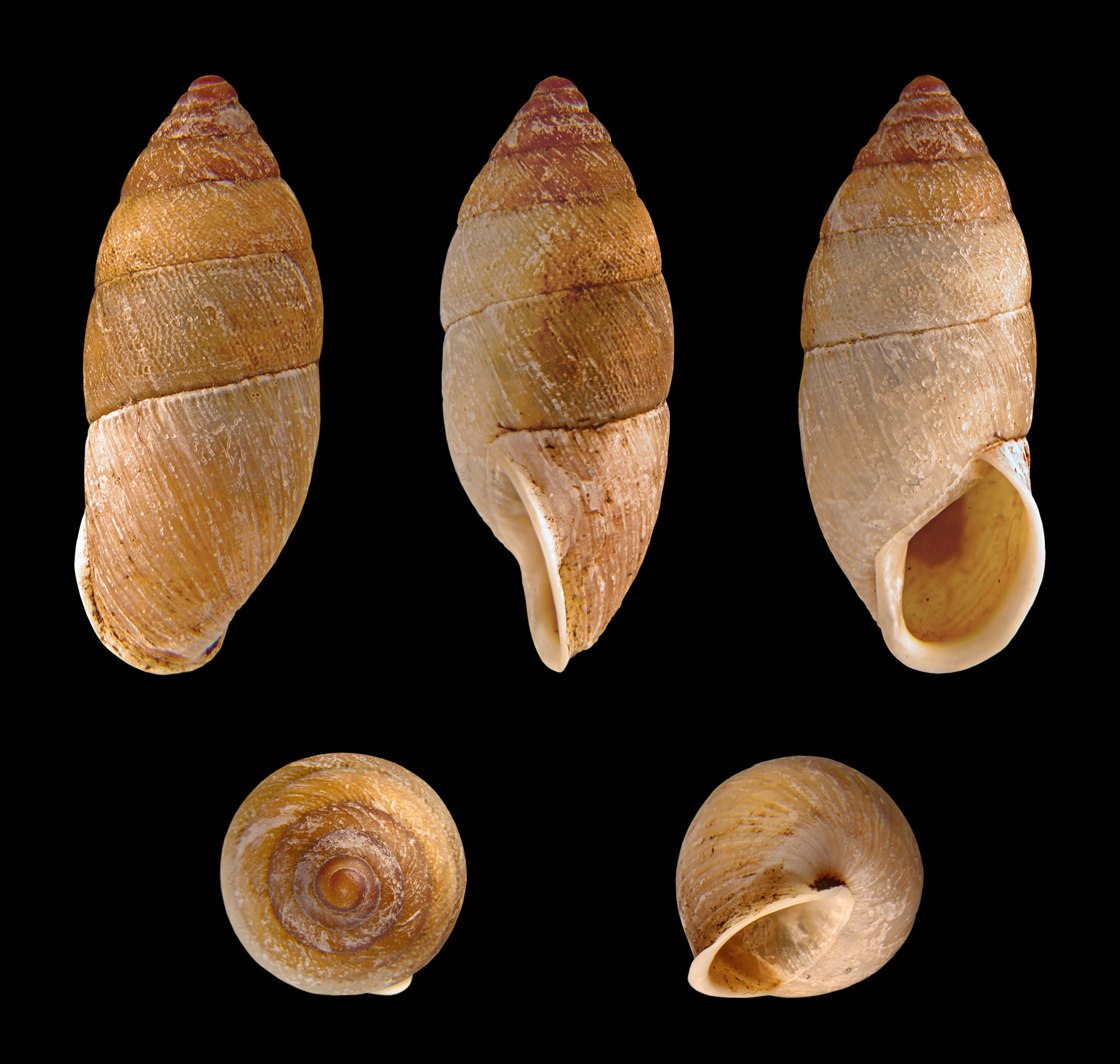
- Napaeus obesatus (Webb & Berthelot, 1833)

Scientific classification
- Kingdom: Animalia
- Phylum: Mollusca
- Class: Gastropoda
- Order: Stylommatophora
- Infraorder: Pupilloidei
- Superfamily: Pupilloidea
- Family: Enidae
- Genus: Napaeus; Albers, 1850

Diversity
- 65 extant + 2 extinct + some undescribed species

Synonyms
- Buliminus (Napaeus) Albers, 1850; Ena (Napaeus) Albers, 1850; Napaeus (Macaronapaeus) Kobelt, 1899· accepted, alternate representation; Napaeus (Napaeinus) P. Hesse, 1933· accepted, alternate representation; Napaeus (Napaeus) Albers, 1850· accepted, alternate representation

= Napaeus =

Genus of gastropods

Napaeus is a genus of air-breathing land snails, terrestrial pulmonate gastropod mollusks in the subfamily Eninae of the family Enidae.

== Distribution ==
Napaeus is endemic to the Macaronesia ecoregion: Azores and Canary Islands.

== Species ==
There are three recognized subgenera, Macaronapaeus Kobelt, 1899, Napaeus Albers, 1850 and Napaeinus ^{Hesse, 1933}.

Species within the genus Napaeus include 18 species on the Tenerife, 17 species on the La Gomera and others. Additionally, 11 new species from the Canary Islands were described in 2011.

- Napaeus alabastrinus Frias Martins, 1989
- Napaeus alucensis Santana & Yanes, 2011- on La Gomera
- Napaeus anaga (Grasset, 1857)
- Napaeus aringaensis Yanes et al., 2011
- Napaeus atlanticus (L. Pfeiffer, 1853)
- Napaeus avaloensis Groh, 2006
- Napaeus badiosus (Webb & Berthelot, 1833)
- Napaeus baeticatus (Webb & Berthelot, 1833) - type species
- Napaeus barquini Alonso & Ibáñez, 2006
- Napaeus bechi M. R. Alonso & Ibáñez, 1993
- Napaeus beguirae Henríquez, 1995
- Napaeus bertheloti (L. Pfeiffer, 1846)
- Napaeus boucheti M. R. Alonso & Ibáñez, 1993
- Napaeus chrysaloides (Wollaston, 1878)
- Napaeus consecoanus (Mousson, 1872)
- Napaeus delibutus (Morelet & Drouët, 1857)
- Napaeus delicatus Alonso, Yanes & Ibáñez, 2011
- Napaeus doliolum Henríquez, 1993
- Napaeus doloresae Santana, 2013
- Napaeus elegans M. R. Alonso & Ibáñez, 1995
- Napaeus encaustus (Shuttleworth, 1852)
- Napaeus esbeltus Ibáñez & M. R. Alonso, 1995
- Napaeus estherae Artiles, 2013
- Napaeus exilis Henríquez, 1995
- Napaeus gomerensis G. A. Holyoak & D. T. Holyoak, 2011 - on La Gomera
- Napaeus grohi Yanes et al., 2011
- Napaeus gruereanus (Grasset, 1857)
- Napaeus hartungi (Morelet & Drouët, 1857)
- Napaeus helvolus (Webb & Berthelot, 1833)
- Napaeus huttereri Henríquez, 1991
- Napaeus indifferens (Mousson, 1872)
- Napaeus inflatiusculus (Wollaston, 1878)
- Napaeus interpunctatus (Wollaston, 1878)
- Napaeus isletae Groh & Ibanez, 1992
- Napaeus josei Yanes et al., 2011
- Napaeus lajaensis Castillo et al., 2006
- Napaeus lichenicola M. R. Alonso & Ibáñez, 2007
- Napaeus maculatus Goodacre, 2006
- Napaeus maffioteanus (Mousson, 1872)
- Napaeus magnus Yanes, Deniz, M. R. Alonso & Ibáñez, 2013
- Napaeus minimus Holyoak & Holyoak, 2011
- Napaeus moquinianus (Webb & Berthelot, 1833)
- Napaeus moroi Martín, Alonso & Ibáñez, 2011 - La Gomera
- Napaeus myosotis (Webb & Berthelot, 1833)
- Napaeus nanodes Shuttleworth, 1852
- Napaeus obesatus (Webb & Berthelot, 1833)
- Napaeus ocellatus (Mousson, 1872)
- Napaeus orientalis Henríquez, 1995
- Napaeus ornamentatus Moro, 2009
- Napaeus osoriensis (Wollaston, 1878)
- Napaeus palmaensis (Mousson, 1872)
- Napaeus procerus Emerson, 2006
- Napaeus propinquus (Shuttleworth, 1852)
- Napaeus pruninus (A. Gould, 1846)
- Napaeus pygmaeus Ibanez & Alonso, 1993
- Napaeus roccellicola (Webb & Berthelot, 1833)
- Napaeus rufobrunneus (Wollaston, 1878)
- Napaeus rupicola (Mousson, 1872)
- Napaeus savinosus (Wollaston, 1878)
- † Napaeus servus (Mousson, 1872)
- Napaeus severus (J. Mabille, 1898)
- Napaeus subgracilior (Wollaston, 1878)
- Napaeus subsimplex (Wollaston, 1878)
- Napaeus tabidus (Shuttleworth, 1852)
- Napaeus tafadaensis Yanes, 2009
- Napaeus tagamichensis Henríquez, 1993
- Napaeus taguluchensis Henríquez, 1993
- Napaeus tenoensis Henríquez, 1993
- Napaeus teobaldoi Martín, 2009
- Napaeus texturatus (Mousson, 1872)
- Napaeus torilensis Artiles & Deniz, 2011 - on La Gomera
- Napaeus tremulans (Mousson, 1858)
- Napaeus validoi Yanes et al., 2011
- Napaeus variatus (Webb & Berthelot, 1833)
- Napaeus venegueraensis Yanes et al., 2011
- Napaeus voggenreiteri Hutterer, 2006
- Napaeus vulgaris (Morelet & Drouët, 1857)

Species brought into synonymy

- Napaeus arcuatus (Kuester, 1845): synonym of Pseudonapaeus arcuatus (Kuester, 1845) (unaccepted combination)
- Napaeus candelaris (L. Pfeiffer, 1846): synonym of Pseudonapaeus candelaris (L. Pfeiffer, 1846) (unaccepted combination)
- Napaeus coelebs (L. Pfeiffer, 1846): synonym of Pseudonapaeus coelebs (L. Pfeiffer, 1846) (unaccepted combination)
- Napaeus sindicus (Reeve, 1848): synonym of Pseudonapaeus sindicus (Reeve, 1848) (unaccepted combination)
- Napaeus vincentii (Gredler, 1898): synonym of Serina vincentii (Gredler, 1898)
