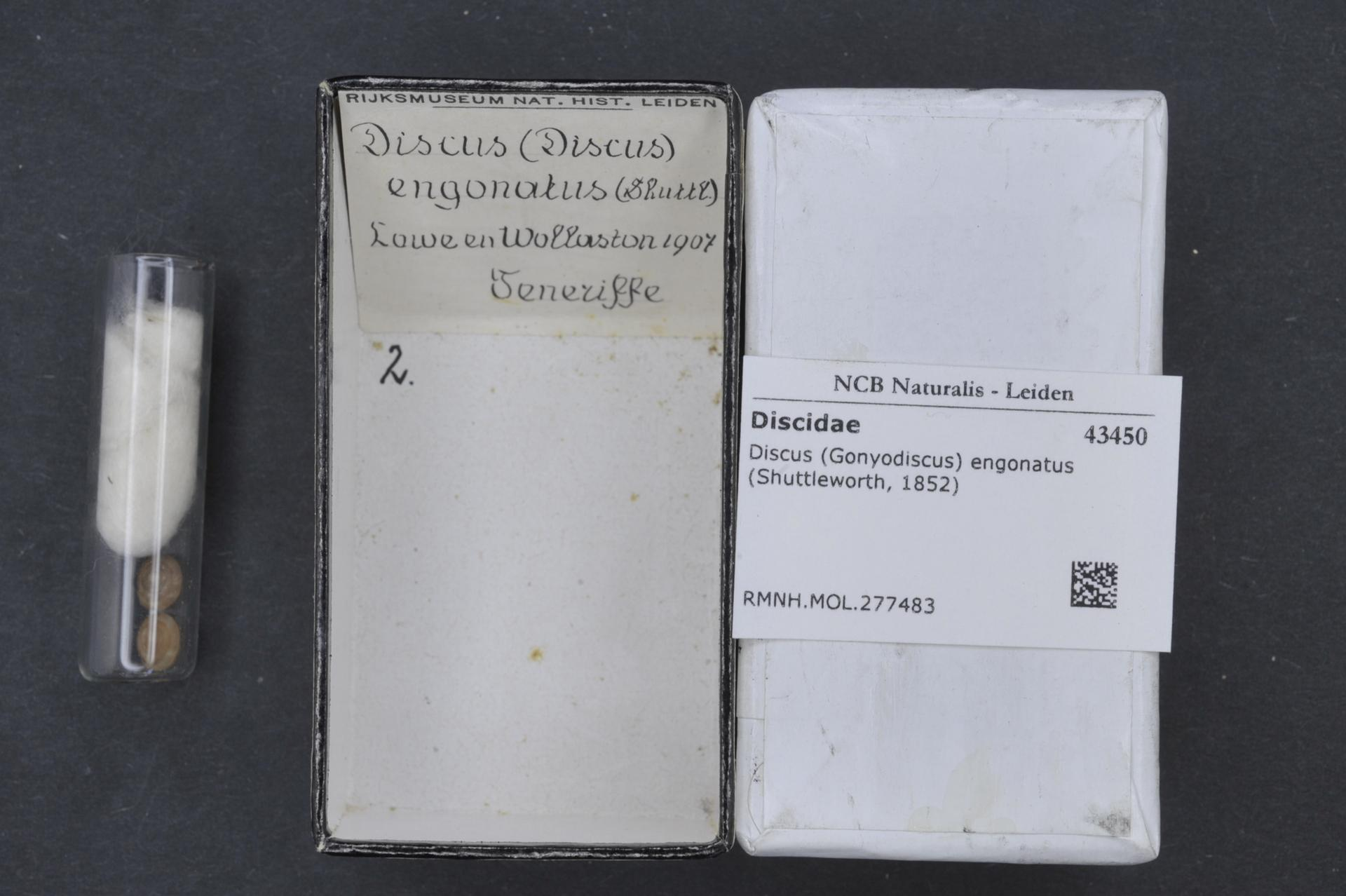

Conservation status
- Critically endangered, possibly extinct (IUCN 3.1)

Scientific classification
- Kingdom: Animalia
- Phylum: Mollusca
- Class: Gastropoda
- Order: Stylommatophora
- Family: Discidae
- Genus: Canaridiscus
- Species: C. engonatus

Binomial name
- Canaridiscus engonatus (Shuttleworth, 1852)

Synonyms
- Atlantica engonata; Atlantica engonatus; Discus engonata; Helix engonata; Patula engonata

= Canaridiscus engonatus =

Extinct species of gastropod

Canaridiscus engonatus is an extinct species of air-breathing land snail, a terrestrial pulmonate gastropod mollusk in the family Discidae, the disk snails.

Canaridiscus engonatus was listed as Data deficient in the 1996 IUCN Red List, and was later considered to be extinct. The present IUCN status is Critically Endangered (Possibly Extinct).

== Distribution ==
This species was endemic to Tenerife, Canary Islands.
