= Canaridiscus scutulus =

Conservation status
- Least Concern (IUCN 3.1)

Scientific classification
- Kingdom: Animalia
- Phylum: Mollusca
- Class: Gastropoda
- Order: Stylommatophora
- Family: Discidae
- Genus: Canaridiscus
- Species: C. scutulus

Binomial name
- Canaridiscus scutulus (Shuttleworth, 1852)

Synonyms
- Atlantica scutula (Shuttleworth, 1852); Discus scutula (Shuttleworth, 1852); Helix scutula Shuttleworth, 1852

Species of gastropod

Canaridiscus scutulus is a species of small air-breathing land snail, a terrestrial gastropod mollusc in the family Discidae, the disk snails.

This species is endemic to Tenerife, Canary Islands.
