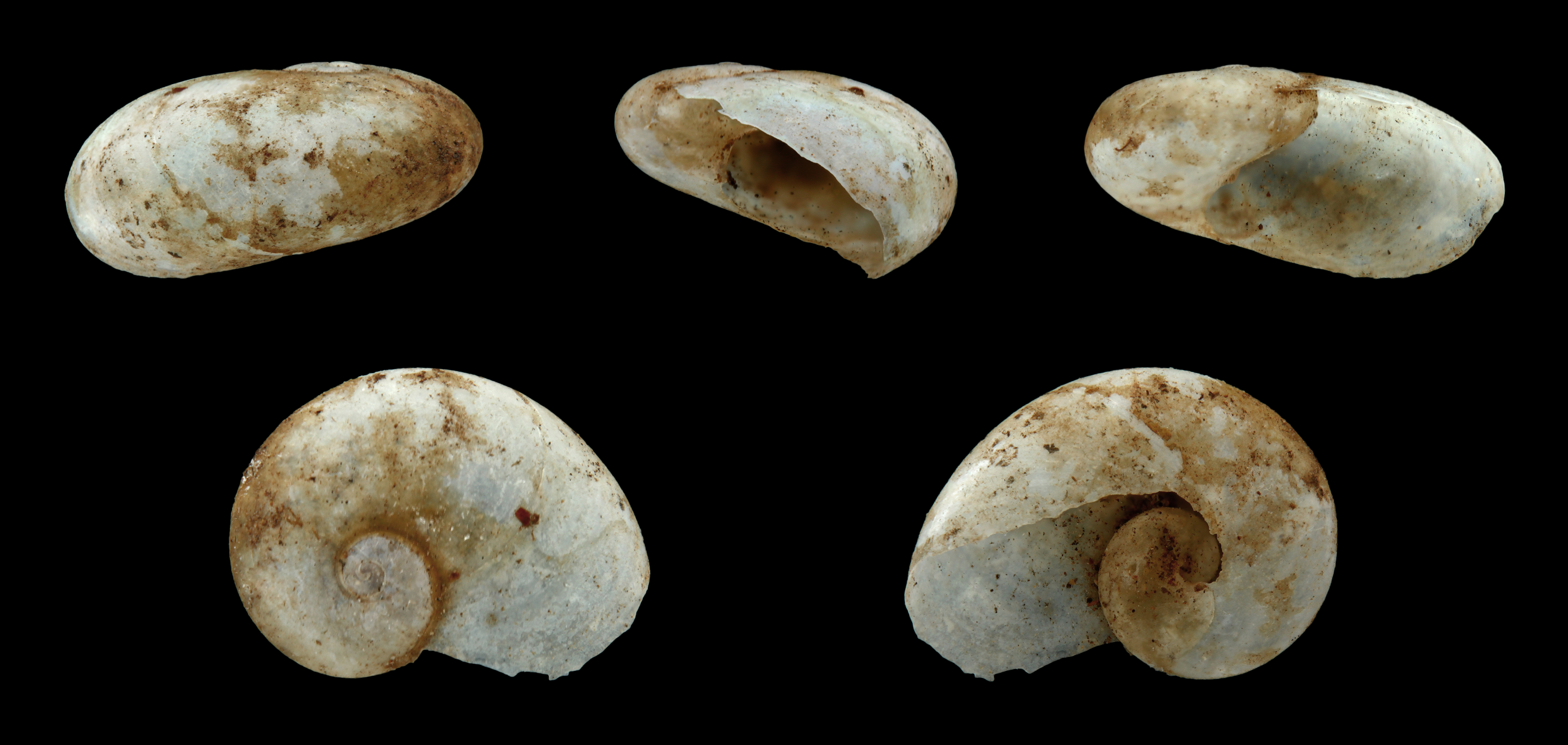
- Insulivitrina mascaensis shell

Conservation status
- Near Threatened (IUCN 2.3)

Scientific classification
- Domain: Eukaryota
- Kingdom: Animalia
- Phylum: Mollusca
- Class: Gastropoda
- Order: Stylommatophora
- Family: Vitrinidae
- Genus: Insulivitrina
- Species: I. mascaensis

Binomial name
- Insulivitrina mascaensis Morales, 1986

= Insulivitrina mascaensis =

Species of gastropod

Insulivitrina mascaensis is a species of gastropod in the Vitrinidae family. It is endemic to Spain.
