= Insignia =

Sign or mark distinguishing a group, grade, rank, or function

Military insignia of the Spanish Army's Captain General

An insignia (from Latin insignia, plural of insigne 'emblem, symbol, ensign') is a sign or mark distinguishing a group, grade, rank, or function. It can be a symbol of personal power or that of an official group or governing body.

An insignia, which is typically made of metal or fabric, is a standalone symbol of a particular or general authority. Together, insignias form a decoration with the different elements of a rank, grade, or dignity.

There are many types of insignia, including civil and military decorations, crowns, emblems, and coats of arms.

== Singular/plural ==
"Insignia" can be used either as a plurale tantum word, i.e. unchanged for both singular and plural, or it can take the plural form "insignias", both equally valid options. The singular "insigne" is rarely used.

== History ==
The use of insignias predates history, both for personal and group (especially military) use. When the insignia was meant to be seen, it was placed at top of a pole or the head of a spear. The Persians used a golden eagle as an insignia, the Assyrians a dove, and the Armenians a lion. The eagle came to serve a more important function as the aquila, the insignia of the Roman legions, around 100 years BCE.

At the earliest times, military insignias were very simple. Tree branches, mauled birds, heads of beasts, or a handful of dry grass, were placed on top of a pole or long stick, so that the combatants could recognize themselves in the fight, or to signpost a meeting place in retreat or defeat. But as the arts of war were refined, sturdier and brighter insignias were designed, and everyone wanted theirs to use characteristic symbols.

Among the Jews, each of the twelve Tribes of Israel had an insignia of a distinctive colour, on which was a figure or symbol that designated the tribe, according to the Blessing of Jacob. Scripture mentions the lion as the symbol of the Tribe of Judah, the ship that of the Tribe of Zebulun, the stars and firmament that of the Tribe of Issachar, and so on.

Idolatrous peoples had images of their gods or symbols of their princes on their insignias. The Egyptians chose the parrot and the crocodile, among others; the Assyrians and Babylonians had doves, as Jeremiah records in chapters XXV and XLVI of his prophecies; because the name "Semiramis", originally "Chemirmor", means "dove".

=== Ancient Greece ===
In Heroic times, a shield, helmet, or cuirass on a spearhead were the military insignias of the Greeks. Nevertheless, Homer records that at the Siege of Troy Agamemnon used a purple cloth to mark the meeting-point for his troops.

Little by little, insignias were used on swords, shields, coins. By 600BCE the Corinthians had already adopted a winged-horse, Pegasus, and the archaic letter koppa, the initial of the town's name. Then Athens had Athena, the olive tree and the owl, Theba a sphinx, Messinia and Laconia used the initial letter of their name. Their colomies followed their metropolis and in this way Syracuse, a Corinthian colony, also adopted Pegasus as the symbol of the town.

=== Persia ===
The principal insignia of the Persians was a golden eagle on the end of a pike, placed on a wagon guarded by two of the most distinguished officers. Xenophon assumes that this insignia was used by all the kings of Persia.

Among the ancient armies, sometimes raising a mantle of purple (or any other color) was all that was needed to make an announcement or give the order to attack.

=== Ancient Rome ===
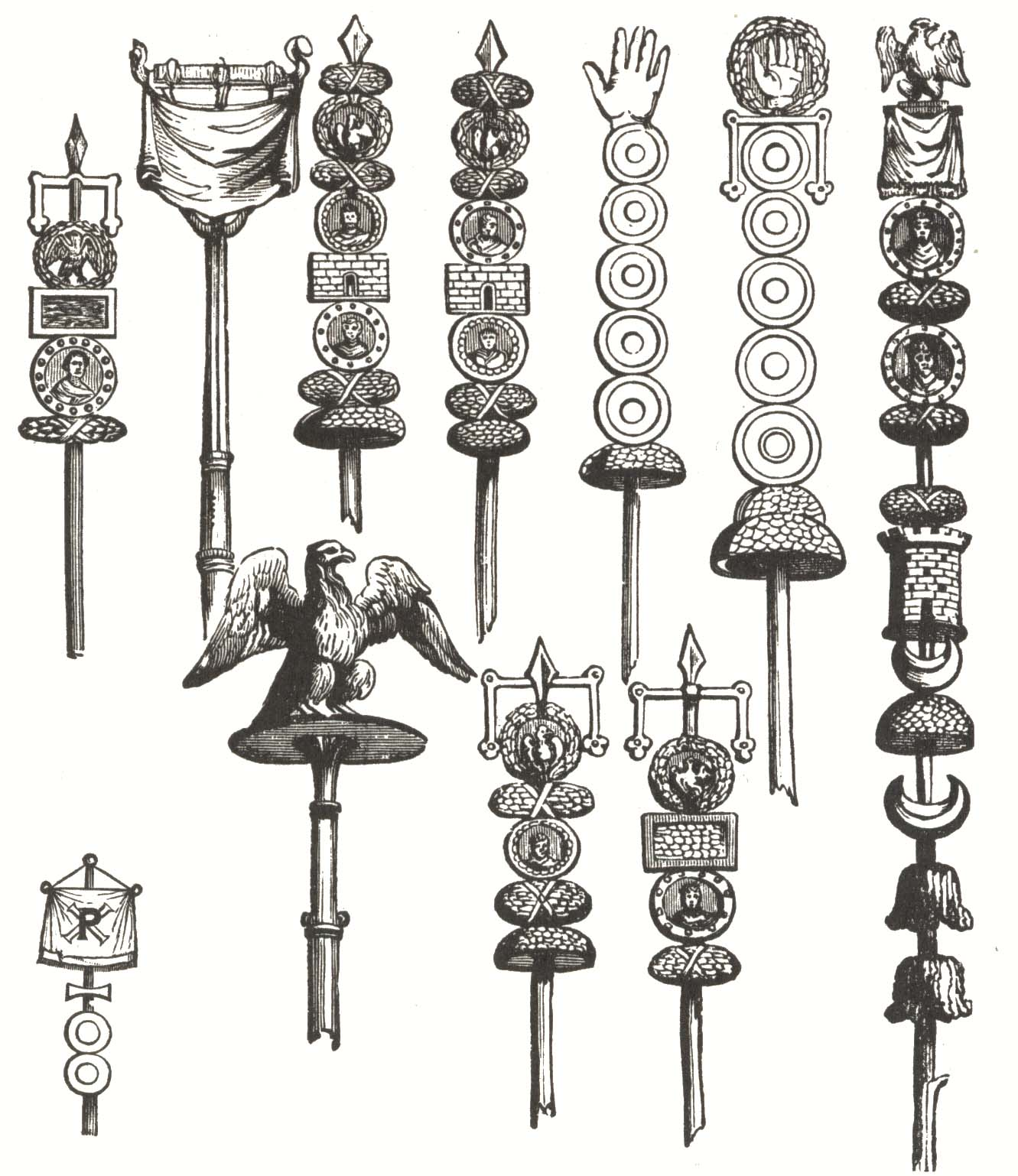
Roman standards

At first, the Romans had nothing more than a handful of hay as an insignia, placed at the top of a pole like most others. Over time they took the figures of a wolf, a horse, a boar, and a minotaur until, according to Pliny the Elder, in the second year of his consulate Gaius Marius replaced them all with the eagle, which became the standard insignia for the legions. Each legion, or at least the first, carried a silver eagle with wings extended, on a sculptural base and placed at the top of a pike. The eagle was entrusted to the centurions of the Triarii.

In the age of the Emperors, the armies were often identified by a silver hand with an open palm (manus), known as the Signum manipuli, as a symbol of loyalty. The insignia was carried by an officer called the signifer. Many examples are seen on Trajan's Column, for which the preliminary plans had it topped with a bird, probably an eagle.

Monuments surviving from antiquity usually are adorned with the insignia of crowns and small shields called clypei, on which probably would be portraits of gods or Roman heroes, with other emblems representing each legion. Some battlements are adorned with insignias as trophies of war.

When Germanicus died, many blamed Piso and the legions removed all mention of him from their insignia.

Vexilloid of the Roman Empire

An eagle is visible on the top of an insignia on Trajan's Column, on a small vexillum or standard. According to Vegetius, the Roman cohorts and centurions wrote their names in the middle of their shields, so that every soldier would know his own. In the centuries before Vegetius, only maniples had insignia: cohorts did not. Sometimes only the vexillum in purple, and the insignia of the unit, were put atop a pike with no further adornment.

The insignias below the eagle were composed of medallions, placed one above the other and nailed to the spear rod. These medallions bore the letters SPQR, Senatus Populusque Romanus, and a portrait of the Emperor.

Each maniple and each centuria had an insignia of the same colour, on which the name of the legion and number of the centuria was embroidered in gold.

The labarum, a standard in which Constantine the Great placed a Christogram, differed from the vexillum in that it was flat and retained its square shape, as seen in the medals of Theodosius the Great and others. The vexillum, which appears often on Trajan's Column, was not protected but at the top.

Vegetius records that in his time the banners in the form of dragons served as insignia to the barbarians. When these came under control of the Romans, they would probably retain their military insignia, which could be confused with the eagles of the Roman legions.

Officers of the Roman legions responsible for carrying the insignia, called insigniferos, be they infantry or cavalry would cover their armor with the pelt of a bear, lion, or other ferocious animal, to indicate the courage and tenacity with which they would defend it.

In times of peace the legions that were stood down deposited their insignias in the public treasury under the custody of the quaestores, who would withdraw them and take them to the Campus Martius when the troops were mobilized, as Livy says: Signa quaestores ex cerario ferre ("The quartermasters must dispense the signs from their stores").

Insignias of the Ancient Gauls and other barbarians represented several animals, including the bull, the lion, and the bear. The Ripuarian Franks had a sword as the characteristic symbol in their insignia, which among them represented the God of war; the Sicambri a head of an ox, which, according to Beneton, meant the god Apis, an Egyptian deity, from which country they were supposedly descendants; the first Frankish kings had a toad.

=== Middle Ages ===
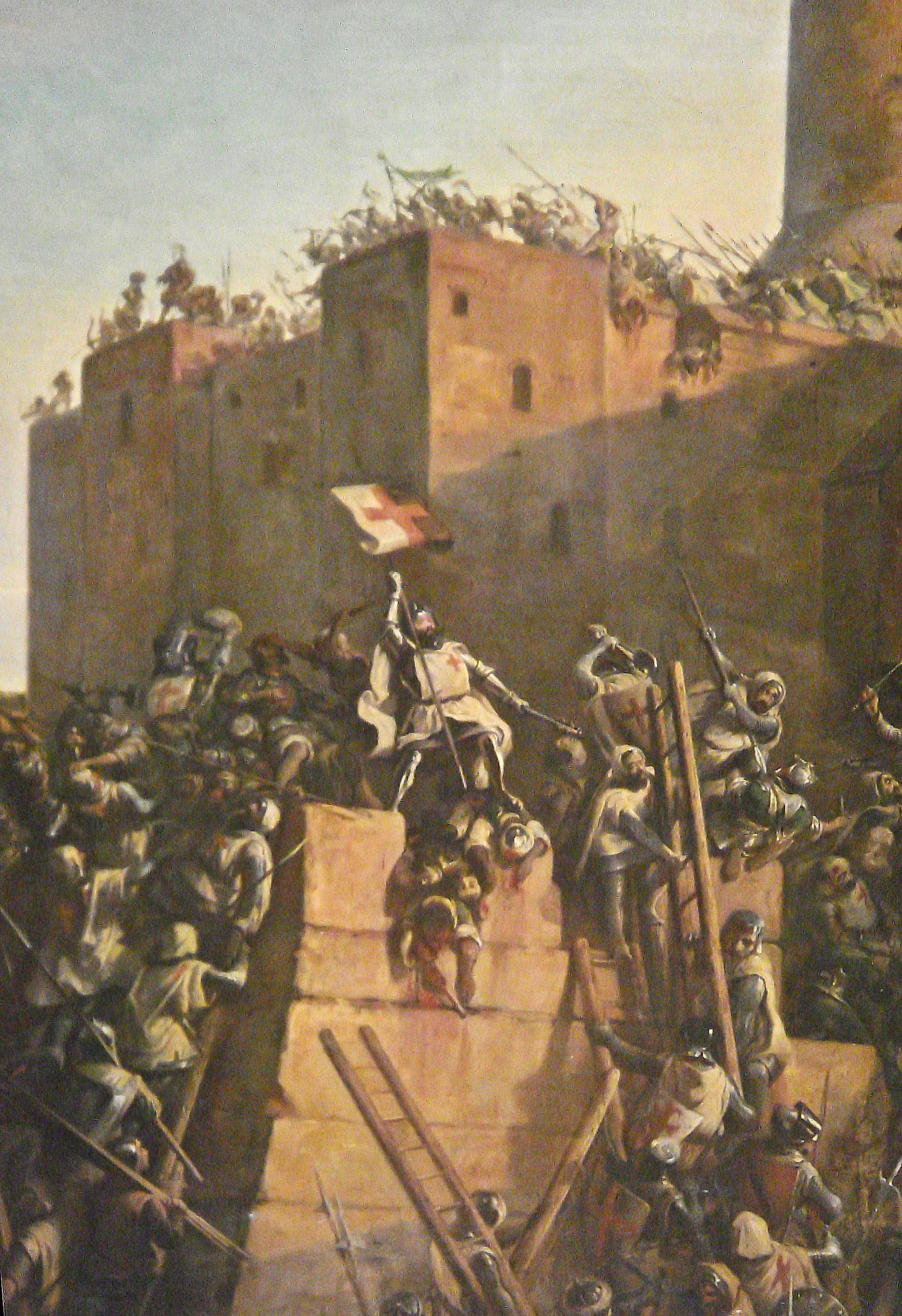
The capture of Jerusalem by Jacques de Molay in 1299. Counterfactual scene with the Templar Grand Master carrying the Order's insignia.

During the Crusades, all the crusaders that went to Palestine put the Christian cross on their banners, often a Maltese cross or Jerusalem cross.

In the Middle Ages each town or village's crest was carried in the militia, for recognition, but also reverence: the settlement's patron saint was painted on the crest, and prayed to for protection. The patron saint of the feudal lord was also put thereon, and on swords and shields. When fixed and permanent troops were established, the princes gave them flags adorned with their swords and shields, or those of the leaders of each body. Some particulars of the military units were also shown on them. Soon the great and the good were pleased to lend their coats of arms to favored units.

=== Modern era ===
The standards and insignias of the Turks were generally of silk cloth of various colors, with a scimitar embroidered with gold and various Arabic characters. At the spearhead was a golden knob, topped by a silver half moon. In addition, they also used to hang some ponytails or large bundles of horsehair, whose number indicated the dignity of the general or pasha commanding the army. When the chief lord commanded in person or was in the army, the flag or main banner bore seven ponytails (Turkish: tug).

The most important standard for the Turks is that of Muhammad, considered the most precious safeguard. It is usually kept in a golden ark, along with the Quran. It is only removed in the direst circumstances.

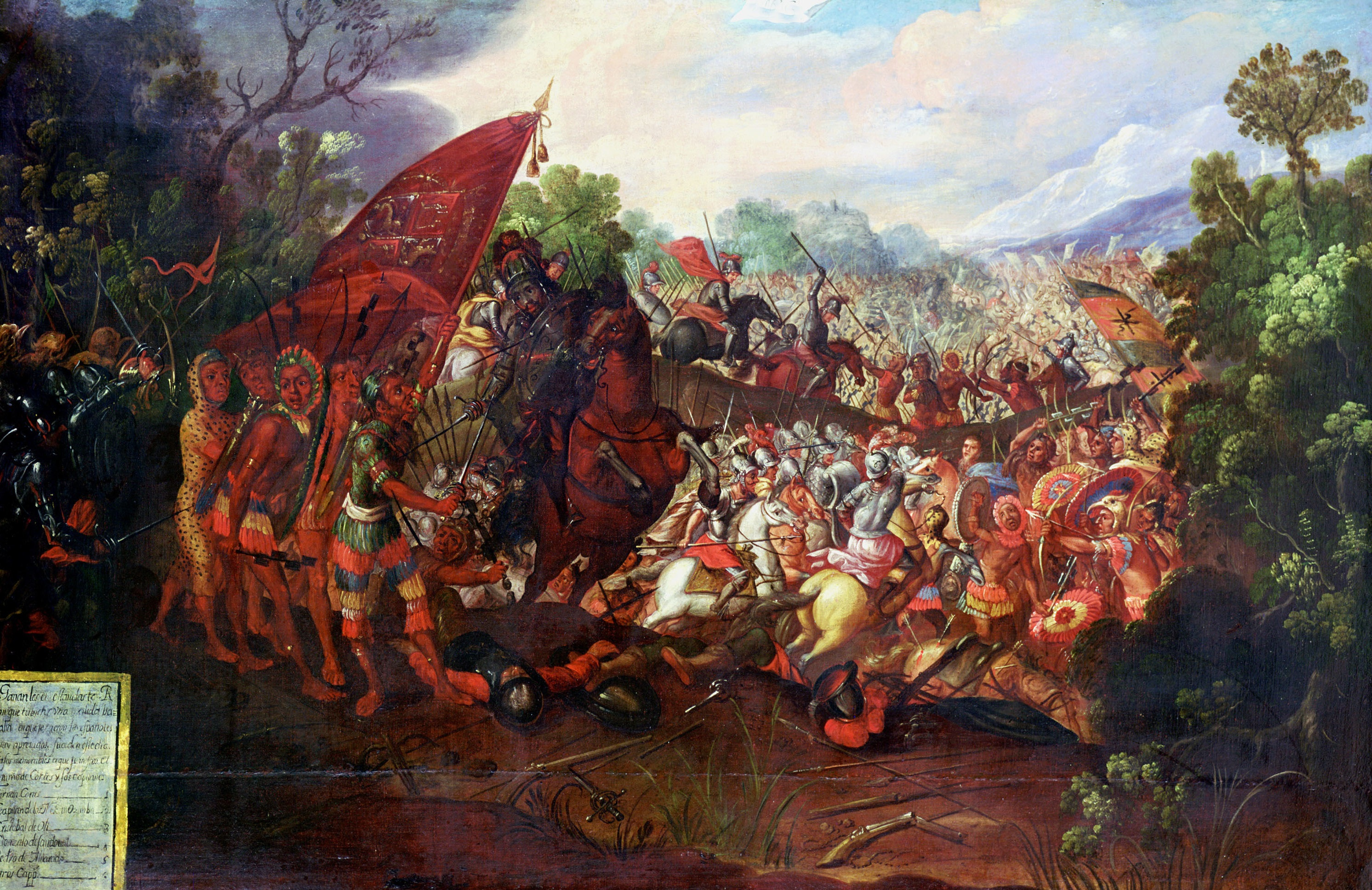
Battle of Otumba

The Royal Standard of the Mexicans, as Solís calls it (the standard seized by Hernán Cortés at the Battle of Otumba) was a filigree of solid gold hanging from a pike, with many colored feathers, which would distinguish it from lesser insignia. This standard was never removed except under the greatest duress, and was never entrusted to same general in chief. Its loss prefigured a loss in battle, so Hernán Cortés fought to the end to seize it, and this decided the battle.

In antiquity, the animate and inanimate objects that were used on insignia derived ultimately from deities and were revered for that reason. With the rise of Christianity in the Middle Ages, those objects were replaced with the Christian cross and the emblems of patron saints, so that insignias were respected even more than they had been before. Even in modern times, loss of an insignia or standard is seen as a profoundly dishonorable misfortune.

== See also ==
- Military colours, standards and guidons
- Emblem
- Coat of arms
- Logo
