= Canaridiscus =

Scientific classification
- Kingdom: Animalia
- Phylum: Mollusca
- Class: Gastropoda
- Order: Stylommatophora
- Infraorder: incertae sedis
- Superfamily: Punctoidea
- Family: Discidae
- Genus: Canaridiscus; M. R. Alonso & Ibáñez, 2011

Synonyms
- Atlantica (Canaridiscus) M. R. Alonso & Ibáñez, 2011 (original rank); Discus (Canaridiscus) M. R. Alonso & Ibáñez, 2011 ·

Genus of gastropods

Canaridiscus is a genus of air-breathing land snails, terrestrial pulmonate gastropod molluscs in the family Discidae, the disk snails.

== Distribution ==
All species are endemic to the Canary Islands.

== Taxonomy ==
Before promotion to full Genus, Canaridiscus was a subgenus, initially of Atlantica and later of Discus.

== Species ==
Species within the genus Canaridiscus include:

- Canaridiscus anagaensis (Ibáñez & D. T. Holyoak, 2011)
- Canaridiscus engonatus (Shuttleworth, 1852)
- Canaridiscus ganodus (Mabille, 1882)
- Canaridiscus gomerensis (Rähle, 1994)
- Canaridiscus kompsus (Mabille, 1883)
- Canaridiscus laurisilvae (Allgaier & M. Klemm, 2012)
- Canaridiscus putrescens (R. T. Lowe, 1861)
- Canaridiscus retextus (Shuttleworth, 1852)
- Canaridiscus rupivagus (Rähle & Allgaier, 2011)
- Canaridiscus saproxylophagus (M. R. Alonso, G. A. Holyoak & Yanes, 2011)
- Canaridiscus scutulus (Shuttleworth, 1852)
- Canaridiscus textilis (Shuttleworth, 1852)
