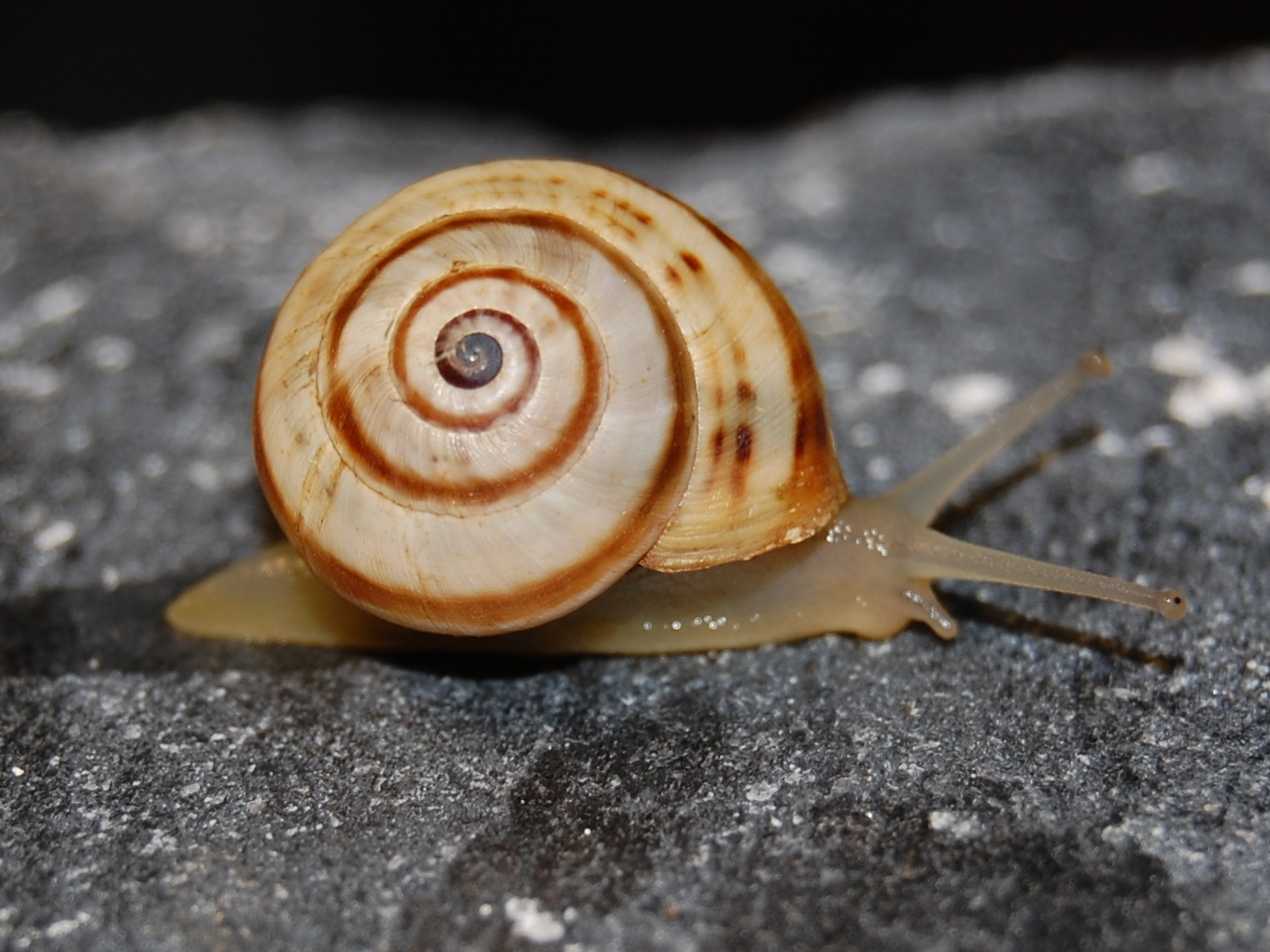
- Active live individual of Theba pisana

Scientific classification
- Kingdom: Animalia
- Phylum: Mollusca
- Class: Gastropoda
- Order: Stylommatophora
- Family: Helicidae
- Subfamily: Helicinae
- Tribe: Thebini
- Genus: Theba; Risso, 1826

Species
- See text

Synonyms
- Euparypha W. Hartmann, 1843; Fruticicola (Theba) Risso, 1826 (unaccepted rank); Helix (Euparypha) W. Hartmann, 1843; Helix (Leucochroa) H. Beck, 1837 (junior synonym); Helix (Theba) Risso, 1826; Helix (Xerophila) Held, 1838; Leucochroa Beck, 1837 (junior synonym); Leucochroa (Leucochroa) Beck, 1837 ·; Xerophila Held, 1838; Xerophila (Xerophila) Held, 1838

= Theba =

Genus of gastropods

Theba is a taxonomic genus of air-breathing land snails, medium-sized pulmonate gastropod mollusks in the family Helicidae, the true snails.

== Description ==
Theba is the type genus of the tribe Thebini. The genus occurs in the Mediterranean Basin, in the Canary Islands, and in Morocco.

== Species ==
Species within the genus Theba include:

- Theba andalusica Gittenberger & Ripken, 1987
- Theba arinagae Gittenberger & Ripken, 1987
- † Theba cartaxensis (Roman, 1907)
- Theba chudeaui (Germain, 1908)
- Theba clausoinflata (Mousson, 1857)
- † Theba costillae Hutterer, 1990
- Theba geminata (Mousson, 1857)
- Theba grasseti (Mousson, 1872)
- Theba impugnata (Mousson, 1857)
- Theba lindneri Kittel, 2012
- Theba macandrewiana (L. Pfeiffer, 1853)
- † Theba milneedwardsi (Filhol, 1877)
- Theba orzolae Gittenberger & Ripken, 1985
- Theba pisana (Müller, 1774) – type species
- † Theba quintanellensis (Roman, 1907)
- Theba sacchii (Gitten & Ripken, 1987)
- Theba solimae (Sacchi, 1955)
- Theba subdentata (Férussac, 1821)
- Theba tantanensis Hutterer, Greve & Haase, 2010

Species brought into synonymy

- Theba albocincta P. Hesse, 1912: synonym of Monacha albocincta (Hesse, 1912) (original combination)
- Theba cemenelea Risso, 1826: synonym of Monacha cemenelea (Risso, 1826) (original combination)
- Theba compingtae Pallary, 1929: synonym of Monacha compingtae (Pallary, 1929) (original combination)
- Theba dofleini P. Hesse, 1928: synonym of Monacha dofleini (P. Hesse, 1928) (original combination)
- Theba hemitricha P. Hesse, 1914: synonym of Paratheba hemitricha (P. Hesse, 1914): synonym of Monacha hemitricha (P. Hesse, 1914) (original combination)
- Theba melitenensis P. Hesse, 1915: synonym of Monacha melitenensis (P. Hesse, 1915) (original combination)
- Theba orientalis Hesse, 1914: synonym of Monacha (Metatheba) samsunensis (L. Pfeiffer, 1868) represented as Monacha samsunensis (L. Pfeiffer, 1868) (junior synonym)
- Theba pontica (P. Fischer in Tchihatcheff, 1866) †: synonym of Monacha pontica (P. Fischer in Tchihatcheff, 1866) †
- Theba rubella Risso, 1826: synonym of Monacha cemenelea (Risso, 1826) (junior synonym)
- Theba samsunensis (L. Pfeiffer, 1868): synonym of Monacha samsunensis (L. Pfeiffer, 1868) (unaccepted combination)
