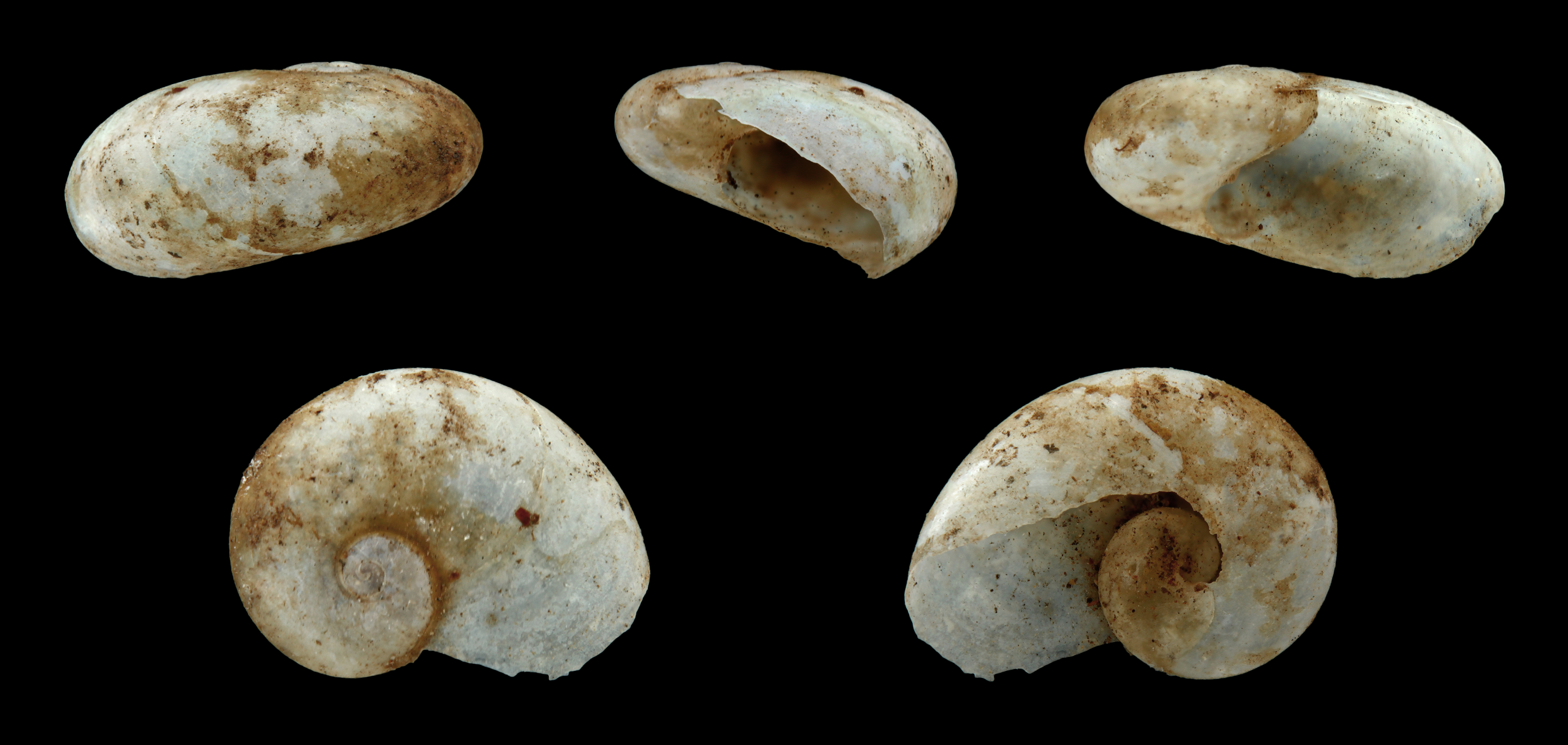
- Insulivitrina mascaensis shell

Scientific classification
- Kingdom: Animalia
- Phylum: Mollusca
- Class: Gastropoda
- Order: Stylommatophora
- Family: Vitrinidae
- Genus: Insulivitrina; Hesse, 1923

= Insulivitrina =

Genus of gastropods

Insulivitrina is genus of small air-breathing land snails, terrestrial pulmonate gastropod mollusks in the family Vitrinidae, the glass snails.

== Species ==
Species with the genus Insulivitrina include:

- Insulivitrina lamarckii
- Insulivitrina machadoi
- Insulivitrina mascaensis
- Insulivitrina reticulata
- Insulivitrina tuberculata
