= Craspedopoma costatum =

Conservation status
- Least Concern (IUCN 3.1)

Scientific classification
- Kingdom: Animalia
- Phylum: Mollusca
- Class: Gastropoda
- Subclass: Caenogastropoda
- Order: Architaenioglossa
- Superfamily: Cyclophoroidea
- Family: Craspedopomatidae
- Genus: Craspedopoma
- Species: C. costatum

Binomial name
- Craspedopoma costatum Morelet & DrouÙt, 1857

Species of gastropod

Craspedopoma costatum is a species of tropical land snail with an operculum, terrestrial gastropod mollusks in the family Craspedopomatidae. This species is endemic to Spain.
