= Craspedopoma =

Craspedopoma Temporal range: 7.246–0 Ma

Scientific classification
- Kingdom: Animalia
- Phylum: Mollusca
- Class: Gastropoda
- Subclass: Caenogastropoda
- Order: Architaenioglossa
- Family: Craspedopomatidae
- Genus: Craspedopoma; Pfeiffer, 1847

Species
- †Craspedopoma conoidale Michaud 1855; Craspedopoma costatum; †Craspedopoma elegans Miller, 1907; †Craspedopoma handmanni Troll, 1907; Craspedopoma hespericum (Morelet et Drouet, 1857); †Craspedopoma leptopomoides (Reuss, 1868); Craspedopoma lyonnetianum; Craspedopoma monizianum; Craspedopoma mucronatum Menke, K.T., 1830; Craspedopoma neritoides (Lowe, 1860); Craspedopoma trochoideum

Genus of gastropods

Craspedopoma is a genus of operculate land snails in the family Craspedopomatidae.

The genus is extant but there is at least four fossil species. C. conoidale is from the Miocene of Italy. C. elegans is from the Ulm region of Germany.
