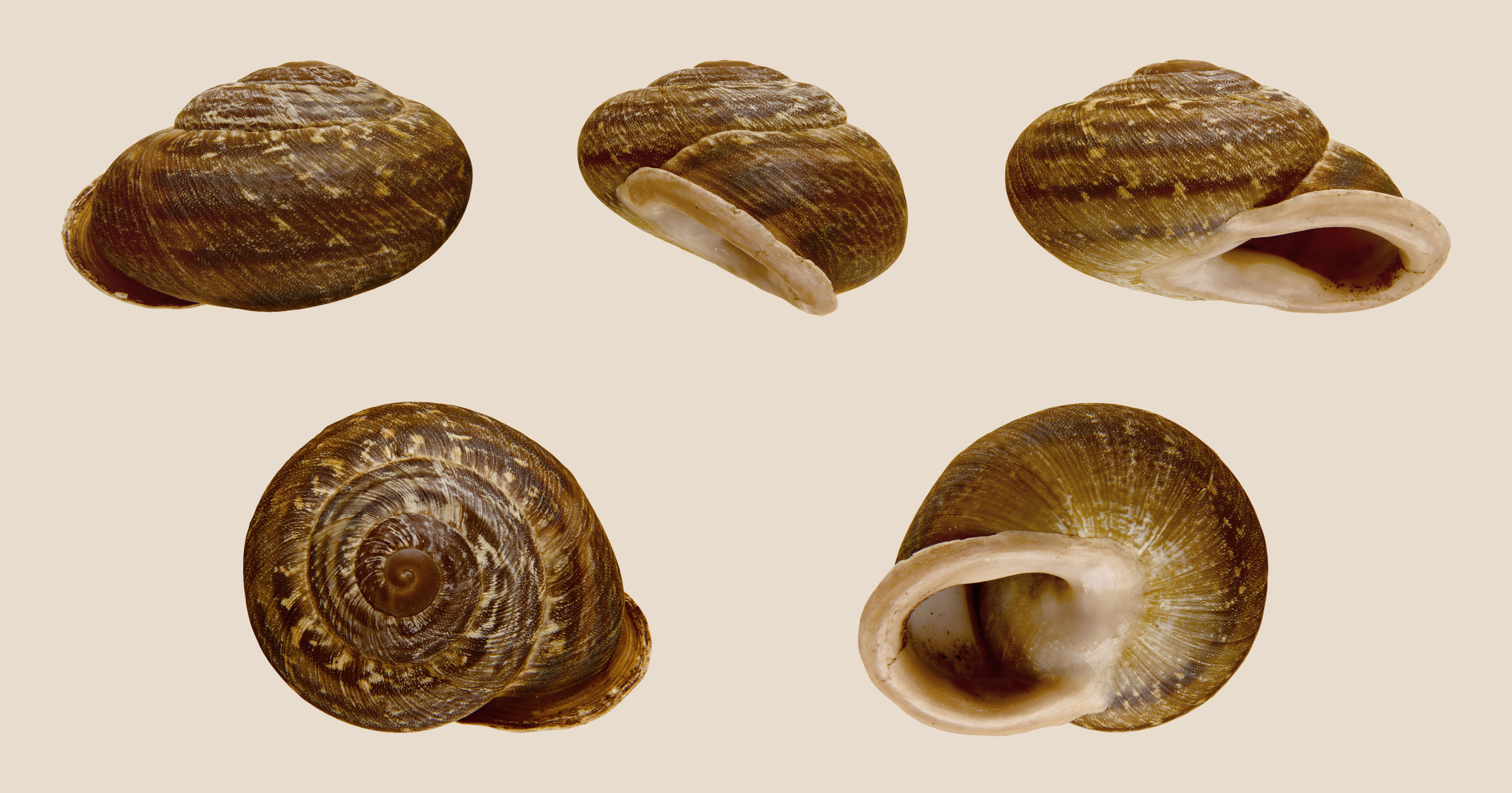
- Shell of Hemicycla ethelema

Scientific classification
- Kingdom: Animalia
- Phylum: Mollusca
- Class: Gastropoda
- Order: Stylommatophora
- Family: Helicidae
- Subfamily: Helicinae
- Tribe: Allognathini
- Genus: Hemicycla; Swainson, 1840

Type species
- Helix plicaria Lamarck, 1816

Synonyms
- Helix (Hemicycla) Swainson, 1840; Helix (Mycena) Albers, 1850 (objective junior synonym ); Hemicycla (Adiverticula) Alonso & Ibáñez, 1988· accepted, alternate representation; Hemicycla (Hemicycla) Swainson, 1840· accepted, alternate representation; Mycena Albers, 1850 (objective junior synonym)

= Hemicycla =

Genus of gastropods

Hemicycla is a genus of medium-sized air-breathing land snails, terrestrial pulmonate gastropods in the family Helicidae, the typical snails.

== Species ==
Species within the genus Hemicycla include:

- Hemicycla adansoni P.B. Webb & S. Berthelot, 1833
- Hemicycla berkeleii (R. T. Lowe, 1861)
- Hemicycla bethencourtiana (Shuttleworth, 1852)
- Hemicycla bidentalis (Lamarck, 1822)
- Hemicycla cardiobola (J. Mabille, 1882) †
- Hemicycla collarifera O. Boettger, 1908 †
- Hemicycla consobrina (A. Férussac, 1822)
- † Hemicycla desculpta (Mousson, 1872)
- Hemicycla diegoi Neiber, R. Vega-Luz, R. Vega-Luz & Koenemann, 2011
- † Hemicycla digna (Mousson, 1872)
- Hemicycla distensa (Mousson, 1872)
- Hemicycla efferata (Mousson, 1872)
- Hemicycla ethelema (J. Mabille, 1882)
- Hemicycla eurythyra O. Boettger 1908 - endemic to Tenerife
- Hemicycla flavistoma Ibáñez & Alonso, 1991
- Hemicycla fritschi (Mousson, 1872)
- Hemicycla fuenterroquensis Castro, Yanes, Alonso & Ibáñez, 2012
- Hemicycla fulgida Alonso & Ibáñez, 2007
- Hemicycla gaudryi (d'Orbigny, 1839)
- Hemicycla glasiana (Shuttleworth, 1852)
- Hemicycla glyceia (J. Mabille, 1882)
- Hemicycla gomerensis (Morelet, 1864)
- Hemicycla granomalleata (Wollaston, 1878)
- Hemicycla guamartemes (Grasset, 1857)
- Hemicycla hedybia (J. Mabille, 1882)
- Hemicycla idairae Verbinnen & Swinnen, 2014;
- Hemicycla incisogranulata (Mousson, 1872)
- Hemicycla inutilis (Mousson, 1872)
- Hemicycla invernicata (Mousson, 1872)
- Hemicycla laurijona Alonso & Ibáñez, 2007
- Hemicycla mascaensis Alonso & Ibáñez, 1988
- Hemicycla maugeana (Shuttleworth, 1852)
- Hemicycla melchori R. Vega-Luz & R. Vega-Luz, 2008
- † Hemicycla merita (Mousson, 1872)
- Hemicycla modesta (A. Férussac, 1822)
- † Hemicycla montefortiana Beck & Rähle, 2006
- † Hemicycla moussoniana (Wollaston, 1878)
- Hemicycla paeteliana (L. Pfeiffer, 1859)
- Hemicycla paivanopsis (J. Mabille, 1882)
- Hemicycla perraudierei (Grasset, 1857)
- † Hemicycla perrieri (J. Mabille, 1882)
- Hemicycla planorbella (Lamarck, 1816)
- Hemicycla plicaria (Lamarck, 1816)
- Hemicycla pouchadan Ibáñez & Alonso, 2007
- Hemicycla pouchet (A. Férussac, 1821)
- Hemicycla psathyra (R. T. Lowe, 1861)
- Hemicycla quadricincta (Morelet, 1864)
- Hemicycla saponacea (R. T. Lowe, 1861)
- Hemicycla sarcostoma (Webb & Berthelot, 1833)
- Hemicycla saulcyi (d'Orbigny, 1839)
- † Hemicycla semitecta (Mousson, 1872)
- Hemicycla vermiplicata (Wollaston, 1878)
