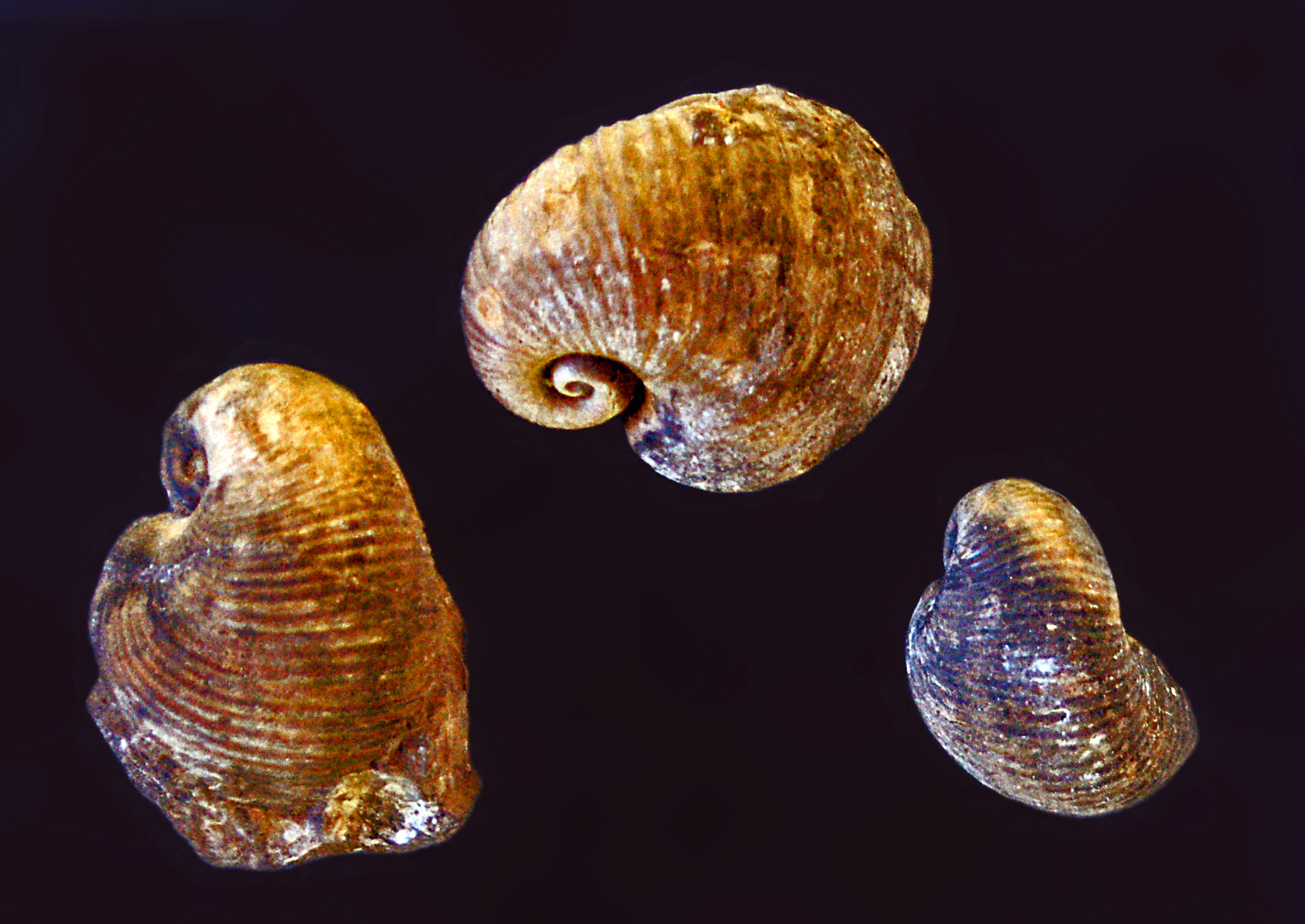
- Tubospirina tubicina from Prague, Jinonice (Czech Republic), at the National Museum (Prague)

Scientific classification
- Kingdom: Animalia
- Phylum: Mollusca
- Class: Gastropoda
- Family: †Craspedostomatidae
- Genus: †Tubospirina; J. Frýda, 1998

= Tubospirina =

Tubospirina Temporal range: Silurian

Extinct genus of gastropods

Tubospirina is an extinct genus of fossil sea snails, marine gastropod molluscs in the family Craspedostomatidae. These snails were parasitic-carnivores. They lived in the Silurian Period, Pridoli Age (from 418.7 ± 1.5 to 416 ± 2.8 mya).

== Etymology ==
The genus name Tubospirina combines the Latin word tubus, meaning "tube" and the genus name Spirina.

== Description ==
The genus Tubospirina is very similar to the genus Spirina, but it can be distinguished by the dextrally coiled shell with a flatly arched upper side. The shells are large, with a wide aperture and a characteristic ornamentation of rounded costae and interspaces. This new genus has been tentatively placed close to the genus Spirina in the family Craspedostomatidae.

== Species ==
- Tubospirina tubicina - Previously known as Spirina tubicina Perner, 1903 - recombined as Tubospirina tubicina according to J. Frýda in 1998.

== Distribution ==
This genus has been found in the Silurian of the Czech Republic.
