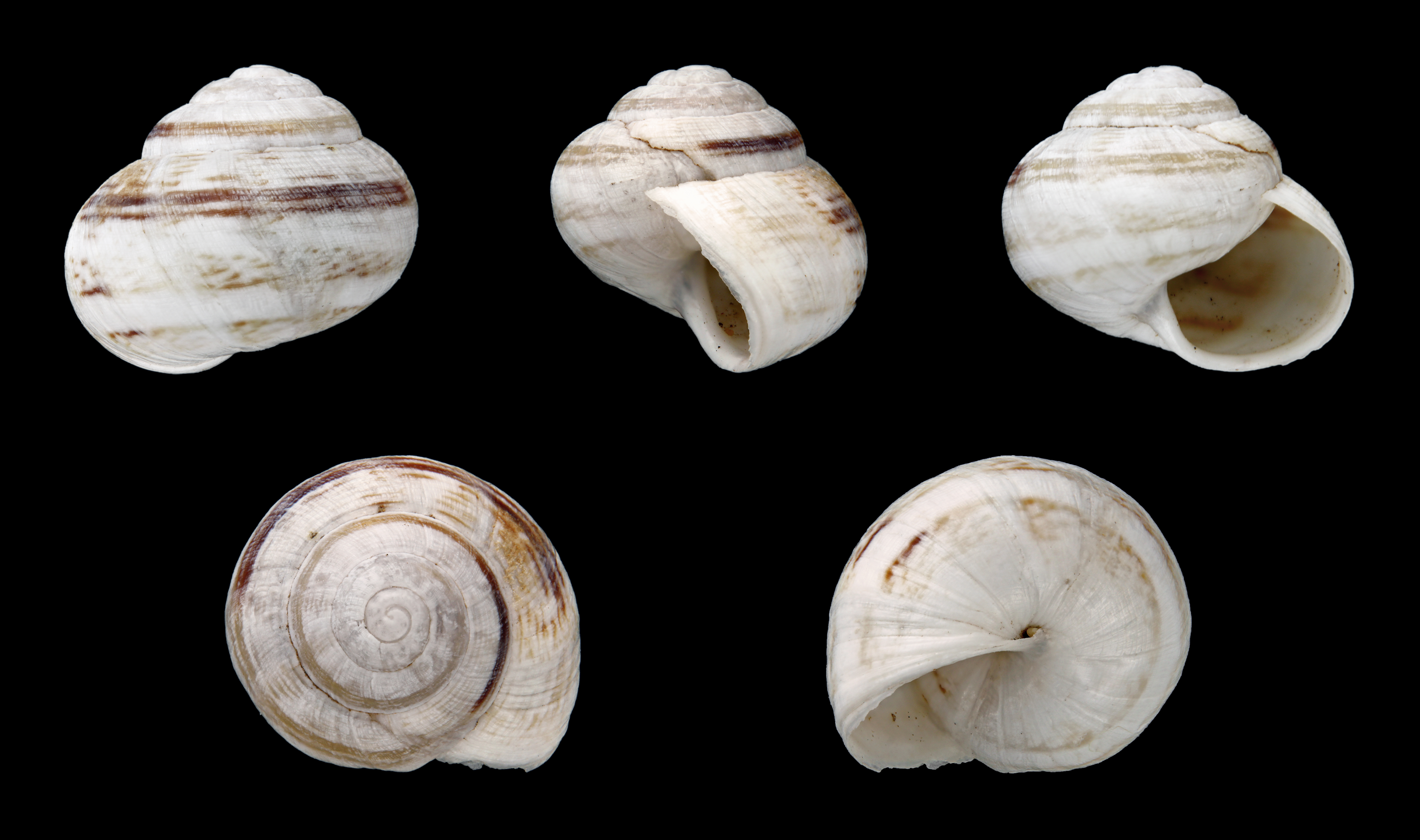
- Theba arinagae

Conservation status
- Critically Endangered (IUCN 3.1)

Scientific classification
- Kingdom: Animalia
- Phylum: Mollusca
- Class: Gastropoda
- Order: Stylommatophora
- Family: Helicidae
- Genus: Theba
- Species: T. arinagae

Binomial name
- Theba arinagae Gittenberger & Ripken, 1987

= Theba arinagae =

Species of gastropod

Theba arinagae is a species of land snail in the family Helicidae, the typical snails. It is endemic to the Canary Islands, where it is known only from the top of a volcano. Its entire range is about 4 square kilometers and it is considered a critically endangered species.

== See also ==
- List of non-marine molluscs of the Canary Islands
