= Canaridiscus retextus =

Conservation status
- Data Deficient (IUCN 3.1)

Scientific classification
- Kingdom: Animalia
- Phylum: Mollusca
- Class: Gastropoda
- Order: Stylommatophora
- Family: Discidae
- Genus: Canaridiscus
- Species: C. retextus

Binomial name
- Canaridiscus retextus (Shuttleworth, 1852)

Synonyms
- Atlantica retexta (Shuttleworth, 1852); Discus retextus (Shuttleworth, 1852); Helix retexta Shuttleworth, 1852

Extinct species of gastropod

Canaridiscus retextus is an extinct species of air-breathing land snail, a terrestrial pulmonate gastropod mollusc in the family Discidae, the disk snails.

Canaridiscus retextus is considered to be extinct.

== Distribution ==
This species was endemic to La Palma, Canary Islands.
