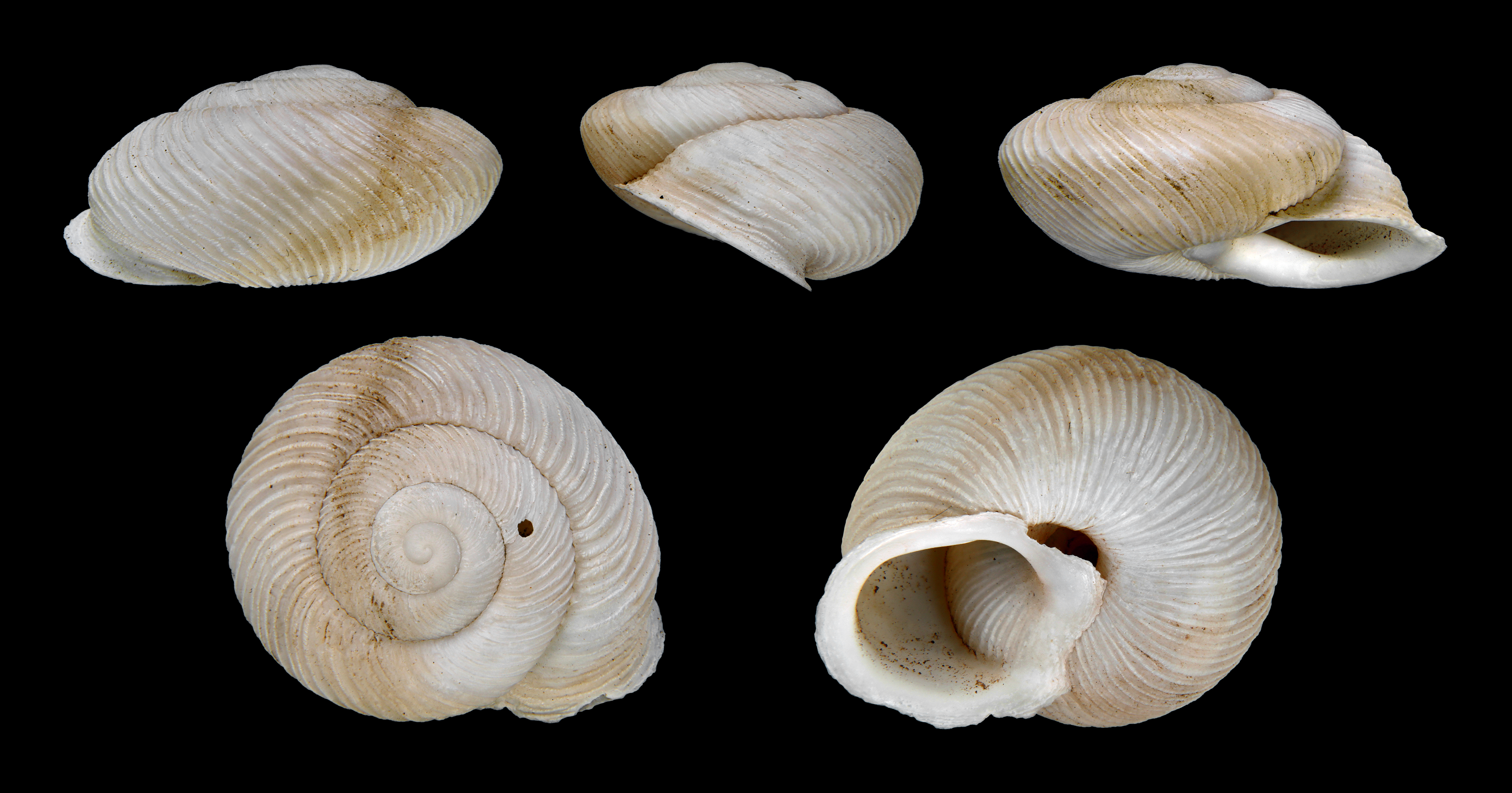
- shell of Hemicycla inutilis

Conservation status
- Vulnerable (IUCN 3.1)

Scientific classification
- Kingdom: Animalia
- Phylum: Mollusca
- Class: Gastropoda
- Order: Stylommatophora
- Family: Helicidae
- Genus: Hemicycla
- Species: H. inutilis

Binomial name
- Hemicycla inutilis Mousson, 1872

= Hemicycla inutilis =

Species of gastropod

Hemicycla inutilis is a species of gastropod in the Helicidae family. It is endemic to the Canary Islands.
