= Napaeus barquini =

Scientific classification
- Domain: Eukaryota
- Kingdom: Animalia
- Phylum: Mollusca
- Class: Gastropoda
- Order: Stylommatophora
- Family: Enidae
- Genus: Napaeus
- Species: N. barquini

Binomial name
- Napaeus barquini Alonso & Ibáñez, 2006

Species of gastropod

Napaeus barquini is a species of air-breathing land snail, a terrestrial pulmonate gastropod mollusk in the family Enidae.

== Distribution ==
This species is endemic to La Gomera in the Canary Islands.

== Ecology ==
Napaeus barquini lives on open rocks.

Napaeus barquini actively adds lichens to its shell as a camouflage.
