= Canaridiscus textilis =

Conservation status
- Data Deficient (IUCN 3.1)

Scientific classification
- Kingdom: Animalia
- Phylum: Mollusca
- Class: Gastropoda
- Order: Stylommatophora
- Family: Discidae
- Genus: Canaridiscus
- Species: C. textilis

Binomial name
- Canaridiscus textilis (Shuttleworth, 1852)

Synonyms
- Atlantica textilis (Shuttleworth, 1852); Discus textilis (Shuttleworth, 1852); Helix textilis Shuttleworth, 1852

Extinct species of gastropod

Canaridiscus textilis is an extinct species of air-breathing land snail, a terrestrial pulmonate gastropod mollusk in the family Discidae, the disk snails.

Canaridiscus textilis is considered to be extinct.

== Distribution ==
This species was endemic to La Palma, Canary Islands.
