= Insulivitrina machadoi =

Conservation status
- Near Threatened (IUCN 2.3)

Scientific classification
- Kingdom: Animalia
- Phylum: Mollusca
- Class: Gastropoda
- Order: Stylommatophora
- Family: Vitrinidae
- Genus: Insulivitrina
- Species: I. machadoi

Binomial name
- Insulivitrina machadoi Ibanez & Alonso, 1990

Species of gastropod

Insulivitrina machadoi is a species of gastropod in the Vitrinidae family. It is endemic to Spain.
