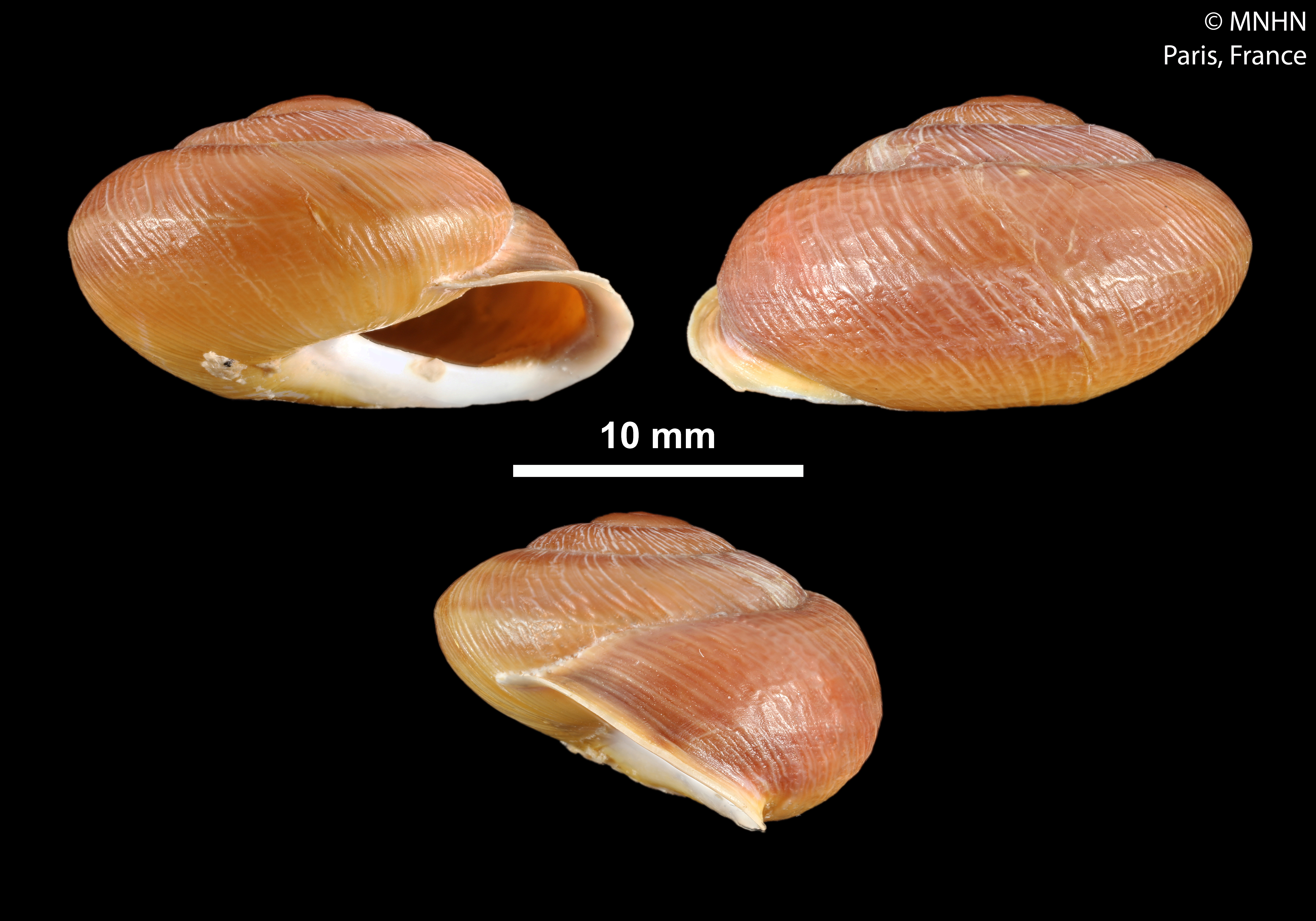
- Hemicycla modesta shell (syntype at MNHN, Paris)

Conservation status
- Critically Endangered (IUCN 3.1)

Scientific classification
- Kingdom: Animalia
- Phylum: Mollusca
- Class: Gastropoda
- Order: Stylommatophora
- Family: Helicidae
- Genus: Hemicycla
- Species: H. modesta

Binomial name
- Hemicycla modesta (Férussac, 1821)

= Hemicycla modesta =

Species of gastropod

Hemicycla modesta is a species of gastropod in the family Helicidae.

== Description ==
The length of the shell attains 16.7 mm.

== Distribution ==
It is endemic to the Canary Islands, Spain.
