= Insulivitrina tuberculata =

Conservation status
- Near Threatened (IUCN 2.3)

Scientific classification
- Kingdom: Animalia
- Phylum: Mollusca
- Class: Gastropoda
- Order: Stylommatophora
- Family: Vitrinidae
- Genus: Insulivitrina
- Species: I. tuberculata

Binomial name
- Insulivitrina tuberculata Ibanez & Alonso, 1986

Species of gastropod

Insulivitrina tuberculata is a species of gastropod in the family Vitrinidae. It is endemic to Spain.

== Sources ==
- Groh, K.; Alonso, M.R. (2011). "Plutonia tuberculata". IUCN Red List of Threatened Species. 2011 e.T10836A3221402. doi:10.2305/IUCN.UK.2011-1.RLTS.T10836A3221402.en.
