= Hemicycla saulcyi =

Conservation status
- Critically Endangered (IUCN 3.1)

Scientific classification
- Kingdom: Animalia
- Phylum: Mollusca
- Class: Gastropoda
- Order: Stylommatophora
- Family: Helicidae
- Genus: Hemicycla
- Species: H. saulcyi

Binomial name
- Hemicycla saulcyi d'Orbigny, 1839

Species of gastropod

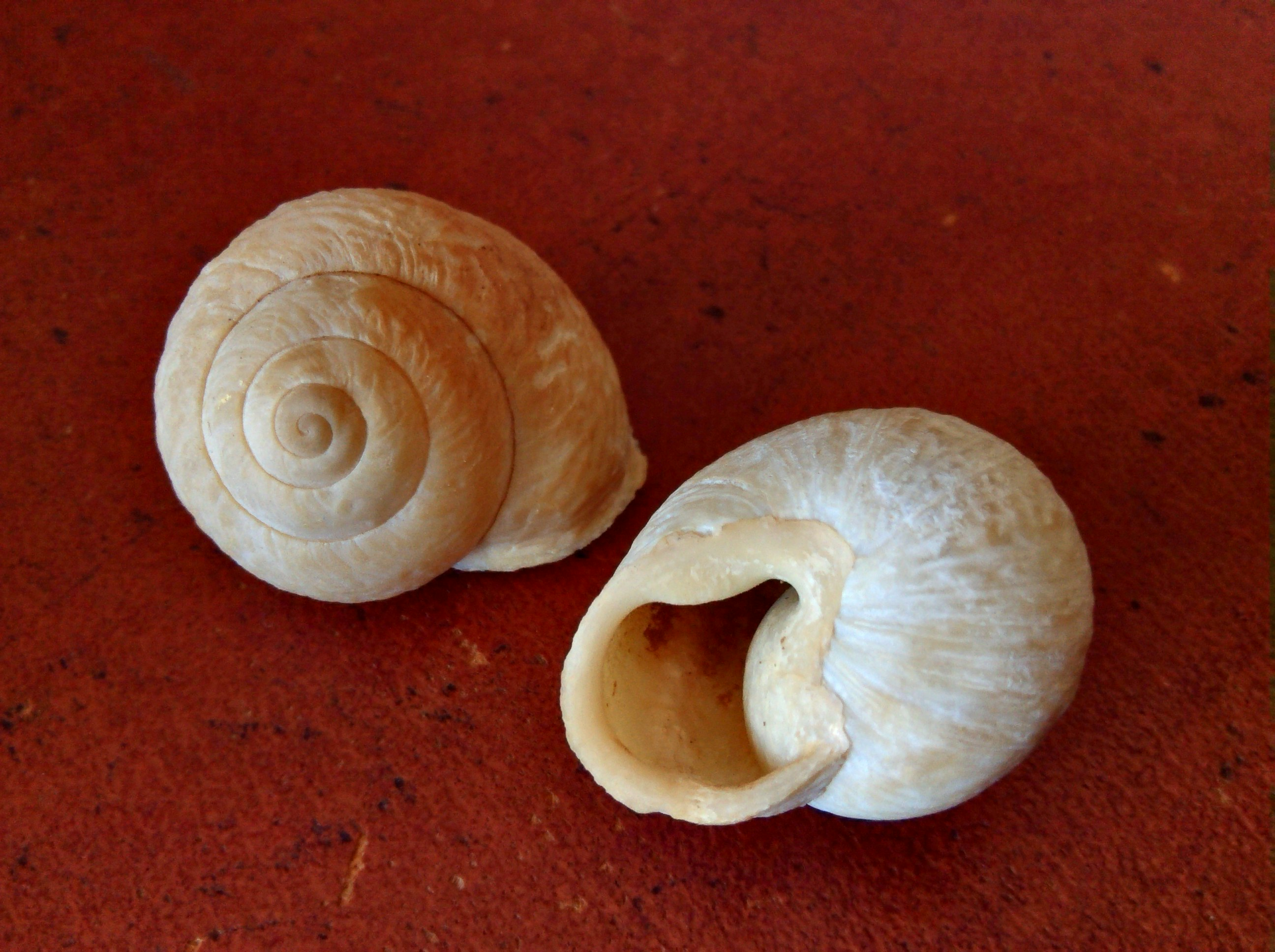
Shells of H. saulcyi

Hemicycla saulcyi is a species of gastropod in the family Helicidae. It is endemic to Spain.
