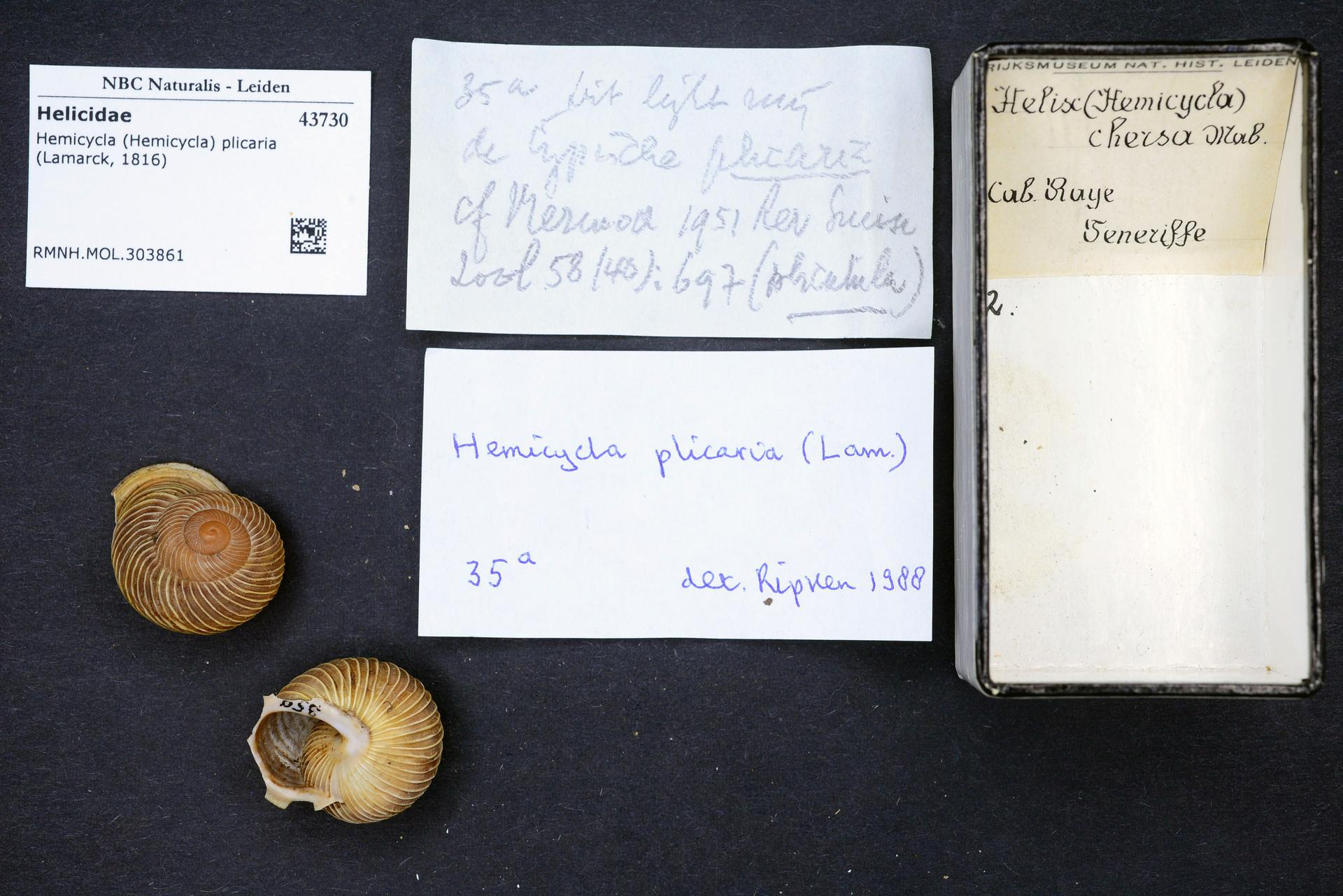
- Hemicycla plicaria shells

Conservation status
- Critically Endangered (IUCN 3.1)

Scientific classification
- Kingdom: Animalia
- Phylum: Mollusca
- Class: Gastropoda
- Order: Stylommatophora
- Family: Helicidae
- Genus: Hemicycla
- Species: H. plicaria

Binomial name
- Hemicycla plicaria (Lamarck, 1816)

= Hemicycla plicaria =

Species of gastropod

Hemicycla plicaria is a species of gastropod in the family Helicidae. It is endemic to Spain.
