= Napaeus pygmaeus =

Conservation status
- Least Concern (IUCN 3.1)

Scientific classification
- Kingdom: Animalia
- Phylum: Mollusca
- Class: Gastropoda
- Order: Stylommatophora
- Family: Enidae
- Genus: Napaeus
- Species: N. pygmaeus

Binomial name
- Napaeus pygmaeus Ibanez & Alonso, 1993

Species of gastropod

Napaeus pygmaeus is a species of air-breathing land snail, a terrestrial pulmonate gastropod mollusk in the family Enidae. This species is endemic to La Gomera, in the Canary Islands.
