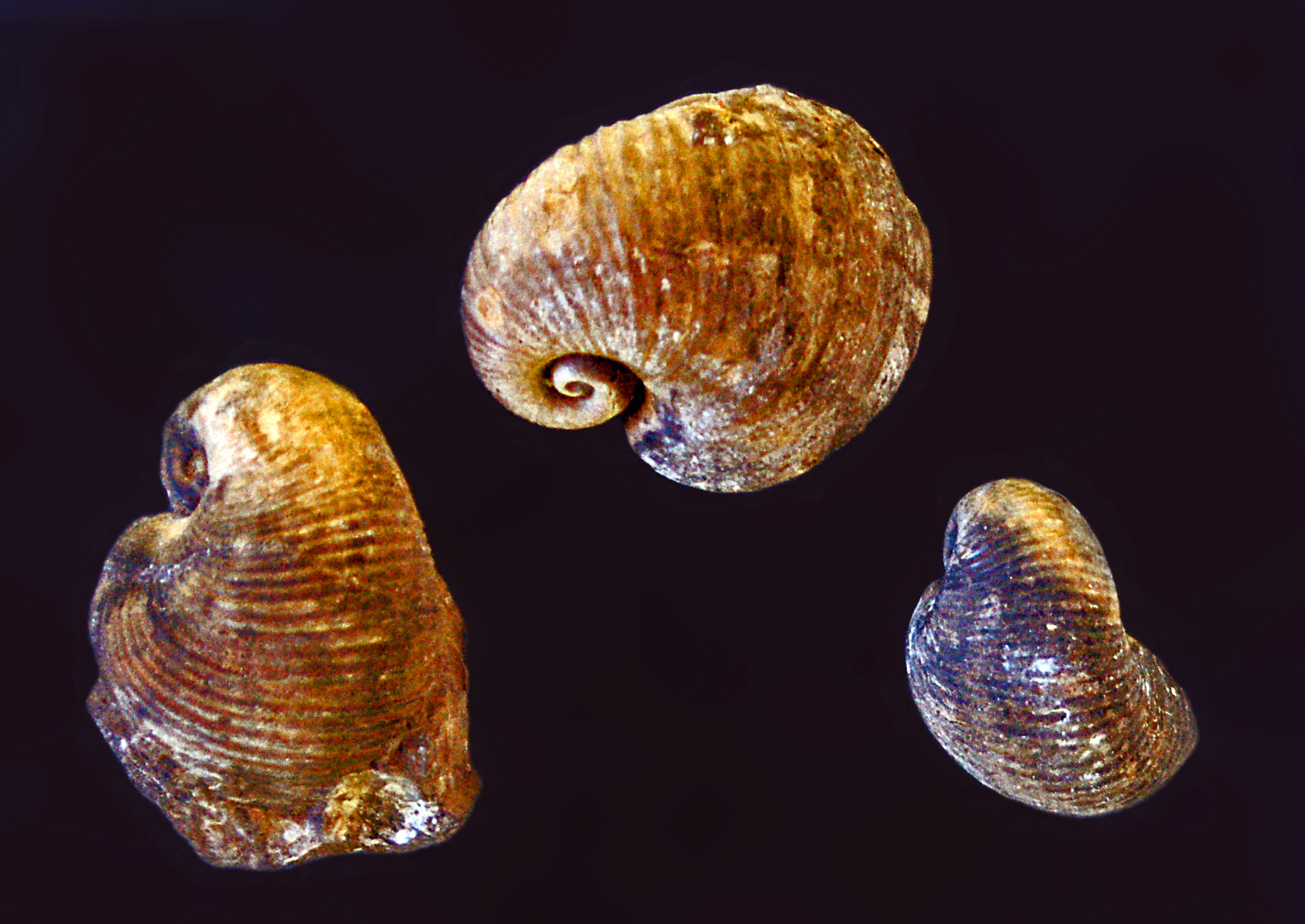
- Tubospirina tubicina from Prague, Jinonice (Czech Republic), at the National Museum (Prague)

Scientific classification
- Kingdom: Animalia
- Phylum: Mollusca
- Class: Gastropoda
- Subclass: incertae sedis
- Family: †Craspedostomatidae; Wenz, 1938

= Craspedostomatidae =

Extinct family of gastropods

Craspedostomatidae is an extinct family of fossil sea snails, marine, gastropod molluscs, with uncertain placement within the class Gastropoda.

== Genera ==
- † Brochidium Koken, 1889
- Bucanospira Ulrich and Scofield 1897
  - Bucanospira contexta
  - Bucanospira expansa
  - Bucanospira fractum
  - Bucanospira tuba
- Craspedostoma Lindström 1884
  - Craspedostoma elegantulum
  - Craspedostoma filistriatum
  - Craspedostoma fugitivum
  - Craspedostoma glabrum
  - Craspedostoma involutum
  - Craspedostoma spinulosum
  - Craspedostoma tuba
- Natiria de Koninck 1881
  - Natiria aequicostata
  - Natiria americana
  - Natiria costata
  - Natiria gemmulata
  - Natiria striatocostata
- Spirina Kayser 1889
  - Spirina antiquata
  - Spirina brilonensis
  - Spirina patula
  - Spirina squamata
  - Spirina symmetrica
- Temnospira Perner 1903
  - Temnospira monile
  - Temnospira percinctum
- Tubospirina J. Frýda 1998
  - Tubospirina tubicina
- Umbonellina Koken and Perner 1925
  - Umbonellina infrasilurica
