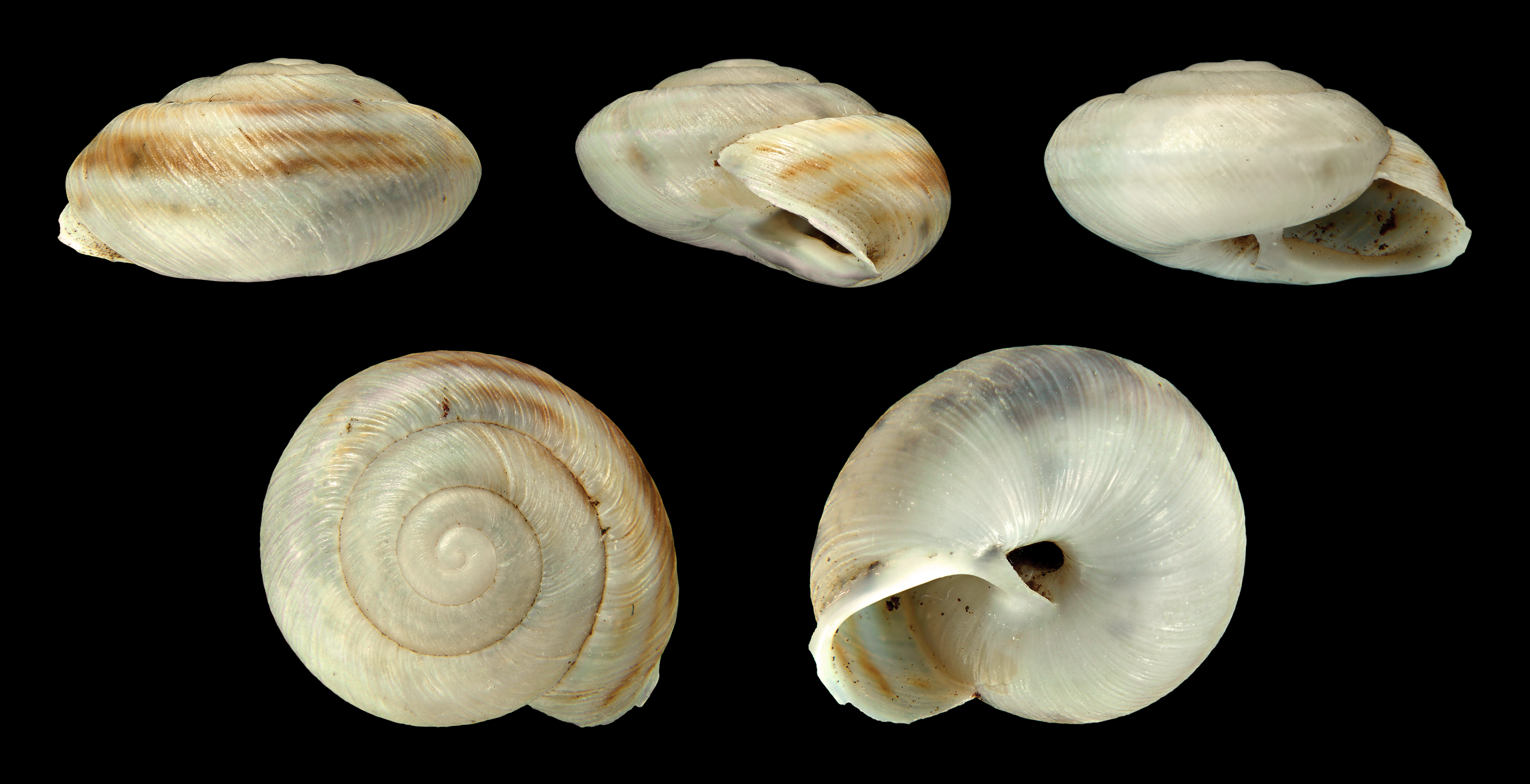

Conservation status
- Critically Endangered (IUCN 3.1)

Scientific classification
- Kingdom: Animalia
- Phylum: Mollusca
- Class: Gastropoda
- Order: Stylommatophora
- Family: Helicidae
- Genus: Hemicycla
- Species: H. mascaensis

Binomial name
- Hemicycla mascaensis (Mousson, 1872)

= Hemicycla mascaensis =

Species of gastropod

Hemicycla mascaensis is a species of gastropod in the Helicidae family. It is endemic to Spain.
