= Insulivitrina reticulata =

Conservation status
- Endangered (IUCN 2.3)

Scientific classification
- Kingdom: Animalia
- Phylum: Mollusca
- Class: Gastropoda
- Order: Stylommatophora
- Family: Vitrinidae
- Genus: Insulivitrina
- Species: I. reticulata

Binomial name
- Insulivitrina reticulata Mousson, 1872

Species of gastropod

Insulivitrina reticulata is a species of gastropod in the Vitrinidae family. It is endemic to Spain.

== Sources ==
- Groh, K.; Alonso, M.R. (2011). "Plutonia reticulata". IUCN Red List of Threatened Species. 2011 e.T10834A3221010. doi:10.2305/IUCN.UK.2011-1.RLTS.T10834A3221010.en.
