= Hemicycla berkeleii =

Conservation status
- Data Deficient (IUCN 3.1)

Scientific classification
- Kingdom: Animalia
- Phylum: Mollusca
- Class: Gastropoda
- Order: Stylommatophora
- Family: Helicidae
- Genus: Hemicycla
- Species: H. berkeleii

Binomial name
- Hemicycla berkeleii Lowe, 1861

Synonyms
- Hemicycla (Hemicycla) berkeleii (R. T. Lowe, 1861)· accepted, alternate representation

Species of gastropod

Hemicycla berkeleii is a species of gastropod in the family Helicidae.

It is endemic to Spain.

== Sources ==
- Bank, R. A.; Neubert, E. (2017). Checklist of the land and freshwater Gastropoda of Europe. Last update: July 16, 2017
