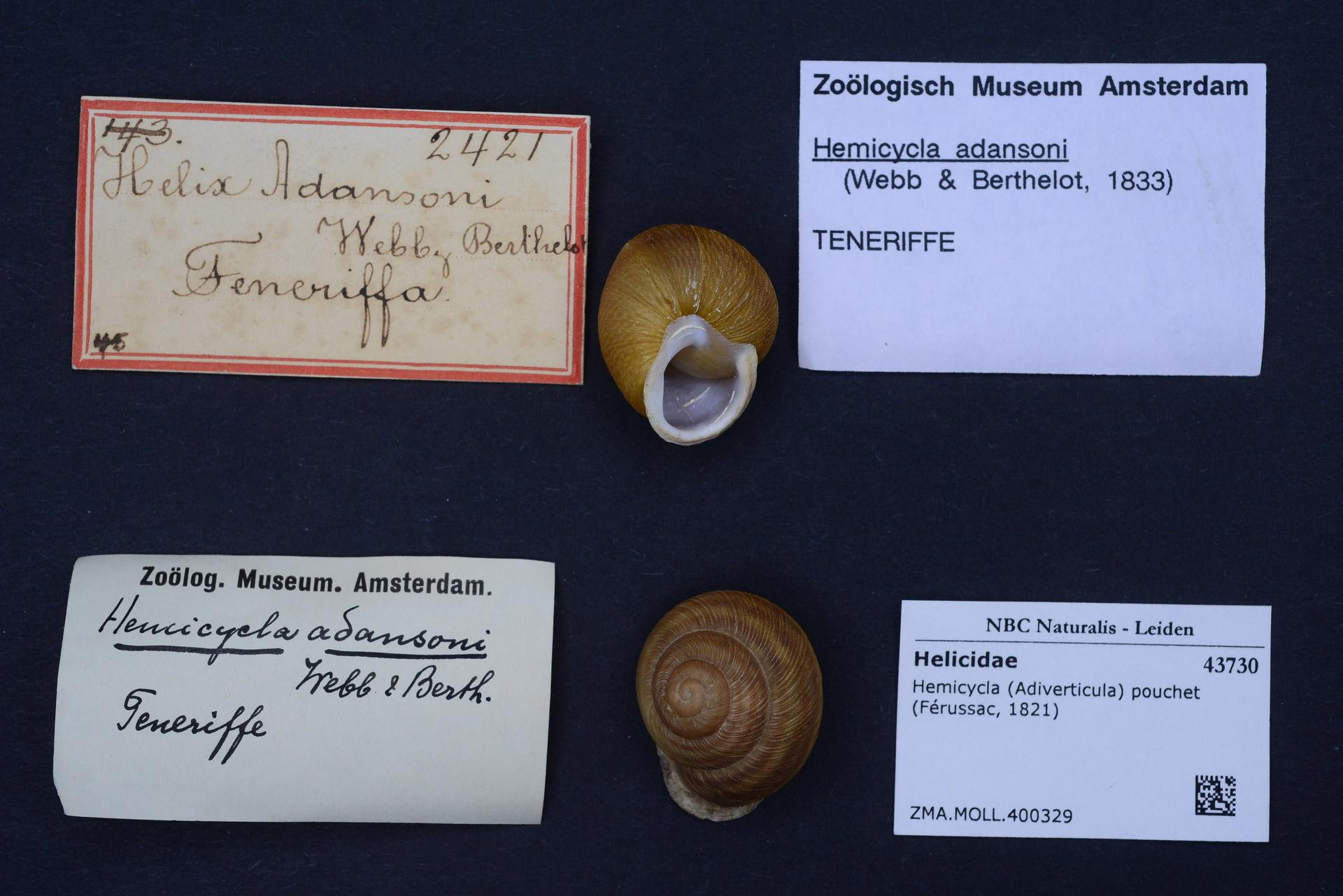
- Hemicycla pouchet shells

Conservation status
- Vulnerable (IUCN 3.1)

Scientific classification
- Kingdom: Animalia
- Phylum: Mollusca
- Class: Gastropoda
- Order: Stylommatophora
- Family: Helicidae
- Genus: Hemicycla
- Species: H. pouchet

Binomial name
- Hemicycla pouchet Ferussac, 1821

Synonyms
- Hemicycla adansoni; Hemicycla (Adiverticula) pouchet (A. Férussac, 1821)· accepted, alternate representation; Hemicycla puchet (A. Férussac, 1821) (incorrect subsequent spelling)

= Hemicycla pouchet =

Species of gastropod

Hemicycla pouchet is a species of land snail in the family Helicidae.

It is endemic to the Canary Islands.
