= Craspedopomatidae =

Scientific classification
- Kingdom: Animalia
- Phylum: Mollusca
- Class: Gastropoda
- Subclass: Caenogastropoda
- Order: Architaenioglossa
- Superfamily: Cyclophoroidea
- Family: Craspedopomatidae; Kobelt & Möllendorff, 1898

Genera
- See text

Synonyms
- Bolaniidae Wenz, 1915

Family of gastropods

Craspedopomatidae is a family of very small land snails with a gill and an operculum, terrestrial gastropod mollusks in the informal group Architaenioglossa belonging to the clade Caenogastropoda (according to the taxonomy of the Gastropoda by Bouchet & Rocroi, 2005).

This family is not to be confused with the family of fossil sea snails with a similar name, Craspedostomatidae.

== Genera ==
Genera in this family include:

- Craspedopoma Pfeiffer, 1847, the type genus
- †Physotrema Sandberger, 1875 (= Bolania)
