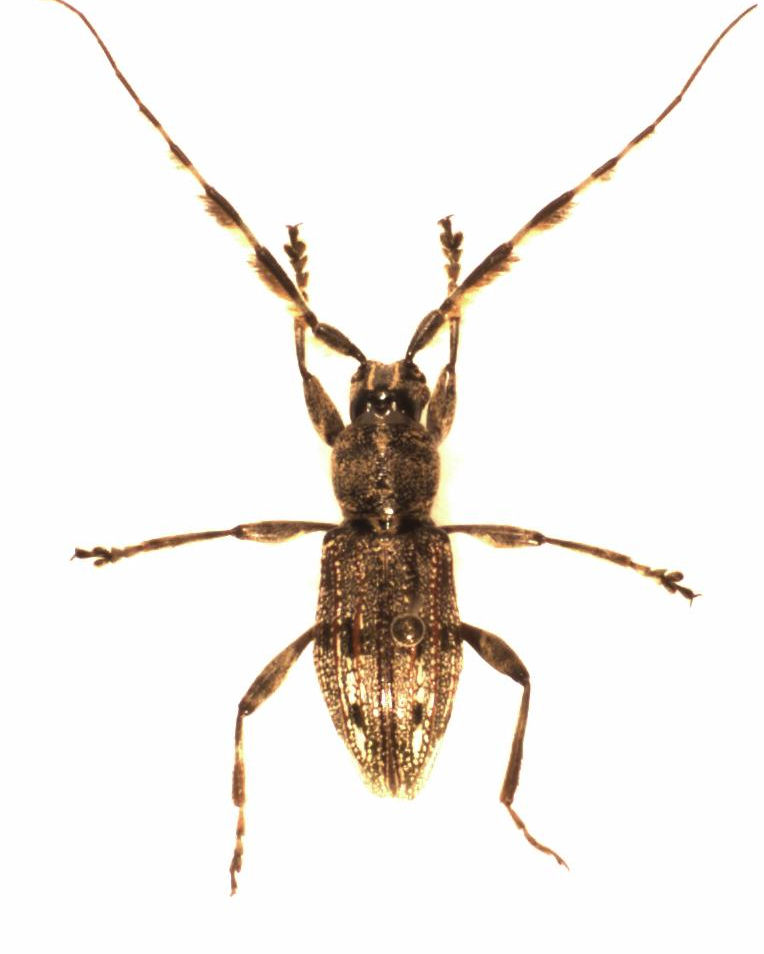
- Hexatricha pulverulenta

Scientific classification
- Domain: Eukaryota
- Kingdom: Animalia
- Phylum: Arthropoda
- Class: Insecta
- Order: Coleoptera
- Suborder: Polyphaga
- Infraorder: Cucujiformia
- Family: Cerambycidae
- Subfamily: Lamiinae
- Tribe: Parmenini; Mulsant, 1839

= Parmenini =

Tribe of beetles

Parmenini is a tribe of longhorn beetles of the subfamily Lamiinae.

== Taxonomy ==
- Adriopea
- Arachneosomatidia
- Athemistus
- Austrosomatidia
- Blaxotes
- Bocainella
- Caledomicrus
- Ceraegidion
- Ceylanoparmena
- Cleptonotus
- Cleptosoma
- Coresthetopsis
- Cupeyalia
- Declivocondyloides
- Deucalion
- Dorcadida
- Echthistatus
- Enotocleptes
- Falsohomaemota
- Gracililamia
- Hexatricha
- Hoplocleptes
- Inermoparmena
- Ipochus
- Luzonoparmena
- Macrocleptes
- Maisi
- Mecynome
- Mesolita
- Microcleptes
- Microsomatidia
- Microtragus
- Mynoparmena
- Myrmeparmena
- Nanilla
- Neocorestheta
- Neohoplonotus
- Neoplectrura
- Neosomatidia
- Ovaloparmena
- Paracondyloides
- Paradeucalion
- Parananilla
- Parmena
- Parmenopsis
- Parmenosoma
- Plaumanniella
- Plectrura
- Rugosocleptes
- Schreiteria
- Sinomimovelleda
- Somatidia
- Somatidiopsis
- Somatocleptes
- Spinhoplathemistus
- Spinosomatidia
- Stenauxa
- Stychoides
- Stychoparmena
- Tangavelleda Téocchi, 1997
- Tricondyloides
- Xylotoloides
