= I. insularis =

I. insularis may refer to:

- Iguana insularis, the southern Antillean horned iguana
- Ipochus insularis, a species of beetle
- Indopadilla insularis, a species of spider
- Ichthyapus insularis, a species of eel
