= Coresthetopsis arachne =

Scientific classification
- Domain: Eukaryota
- Kingdom: Animalia
- Phylum: Arthropoda
- Class: Insecta
- Order: Coleoptera
- Suborder: Polyphaga
- Infraorder: Cucujiformia
- Family: Cerambycidae
- Genus: Coresthetopsis
- Species: C. arachne

Binomial name
- Coresthetopsis arachne (Fauvel, 1906)

Synonyms
- Tricondyloides arachne Fauvel, 1906

Species of beetle

Coresthetopsis arachne is a species of beetle in the family Cerambycidae. It was described by Fauvel in 1906, originally under the genus Tricondyloides.
