= Schreiteria colombiana =

Scientific classification
- Domain: Eukaryota
- Kingdom: Animalia
- Phylum: Arthropoda
- Class: Insecta
- Order: Coleoptera
- Suborder: Polyphaga
- Infraorder: Cucujiformia
- Family: Cerambycidae
- Subfamily: Lamiinae
- Tribe: Parmenini
- Genus: Schreiteria
- Species: S. colombiana

Binomial name
- Schreiteria colombiana Monne & Monne, 2006

Species of beetle

Schreiteria colombiana is a species of beetle in the family Cerambycidae. It was described by Monne and Monne in 2006. It is known from Colombia.
