= Schreiteria bruchi =

Scientific classification
- Kingdom: Animalia
- Phylum: Arthropoda
- Class: Insecta
- Order: Coleoptera
- Suborder: Polyphaga
- Infraorder: Cucujiformia
- Family: Cerambycidae
- Subfamily: Lamiinae
- Tribe: Parmenini
- Genus: Schreiteria
- Species: S. bruchi

Binomial name
- Schreiteria bruchi Melzer, 1933

Species of beetle

Schreiteria bruchi is a species of beetle in the family Cerambycidae. It was described by Melzer in 1933. It is known from Argentina.
