= Somatocleptes apicicornis =

Scientific classification
- Domain: Eukaryota
- Kingdom: Animalia
- Phylum: Arthropoda
- Class: Insecta
- Order: Coleoptera
- Suborder: Polyphaga
- Infraorder: Cucujiformia
- Family: Cerambycidae
- Genus: Somatocleptes
- Species: S. apicicornis

Binomial name
- Somatocleptes apicicornis (Fauvel, 1906)

Synonyms
- Microcleptes apicicornis Fauvel, 1906

Species of beetle

Somatocleptes apicicornis is a species of beetle in the family Cerambycidae. It was described by Fauvel in 1906, originally under the genus Microcleptes.
