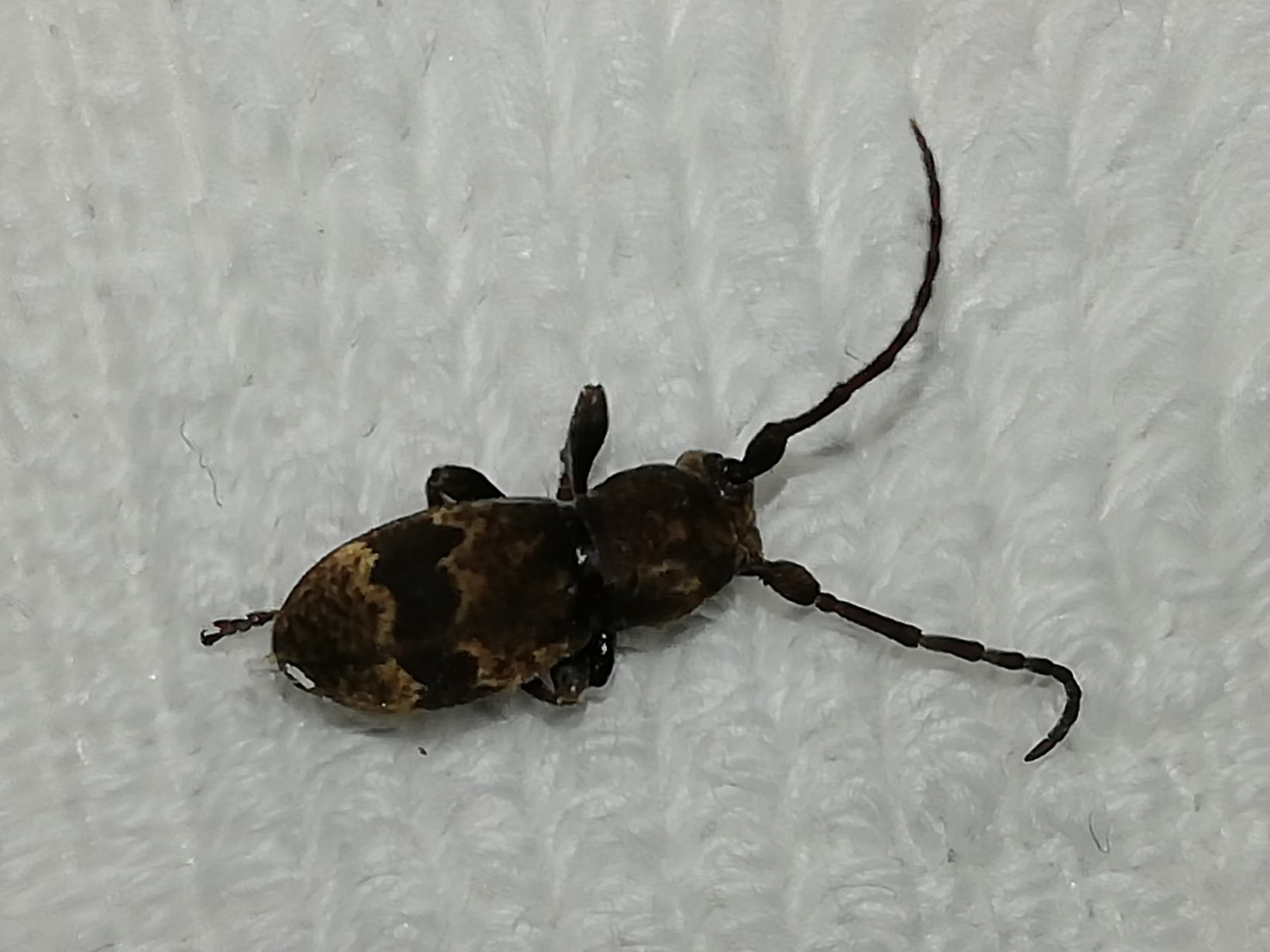

Scientific classification
- Kingdom: Animalia
- Phylum: Arthropoda
- Clade: Pancrustacea
- Class: Insecta
- Order: Coleoptera
- Suborder: Polyphaga
- Infraorder: Cucujiformia
- Family: Cerambycidae
- Genus: Parmena
- Species: P. unifasciata

Binomial name
- Parmena unifasciata (Rossi, 1790)

Synonyms
- Lamia unifasciata Rossi, 1790; Parmena balteus unifasciata (Rossi, 1790); Parmena balteus var. unifasciata (Rossi, 1790)

= Parmena unifasciata =

Species of beetle

Parmena unifasciata is a species of beetle in the family Cerambycidae. It was described by Rossi in 1790, originally under the genus Lamia. It has a fairly wide distribution throughout Europe.
