= Ceraegidion =

Scientific classification
- Kingdom: Animalia
- Phylum: Arthropoda
- Class: Insecta
- Order: Coleoptera
- Suborder: Polyphaga
- Infraorder: Cucujiformia
- Family: Cerambycidae
- Tribe: Parmenini
- Genus: Ceraegidion; Boisduval, 1835

Species
- See text

Genus of beetles

Ceraegidion is a genus of longhorn beetles of the subfamily Lamiinae, containing the following species:

- Ceraegidion dorrigoensis McKeown, 1937
- Ceraegidion horrens Boisduval, 1835
