= Plectrura metallica =

Scientific classification
- Domain: Eukaryota
- Kingdom: Animalia
- Phylum: Arthropoda
- Class: Insecta
- Order: Coleoptera
- Suborder: Polyphaga
- Infraorder: Cucujiformia
- Family: Cerambycidae
- Genus: Plectrura
- Species: P. metallica

Binomial name
- Plectrura metallica (Bates, 1884)

Synonyms
- Phlyctidola metallica Bates, 1884; Plectrura mandshurica Jacobson, 1899; Plectrura sachalinica Jacobson, 1899

Species of beetle

Plectrura metallica is a species of beetle in the family Cerambycidae. It was described by Henry Walter Bates in 1884. It is known from Japan, China, Taiwan, North Korea, South Korea, and Russia.

== Subspecies ==
- Plectrura metallica metallica (Bates, 1884)
- Plectrura metallica yoshihiroi Takakuwa, 1984
