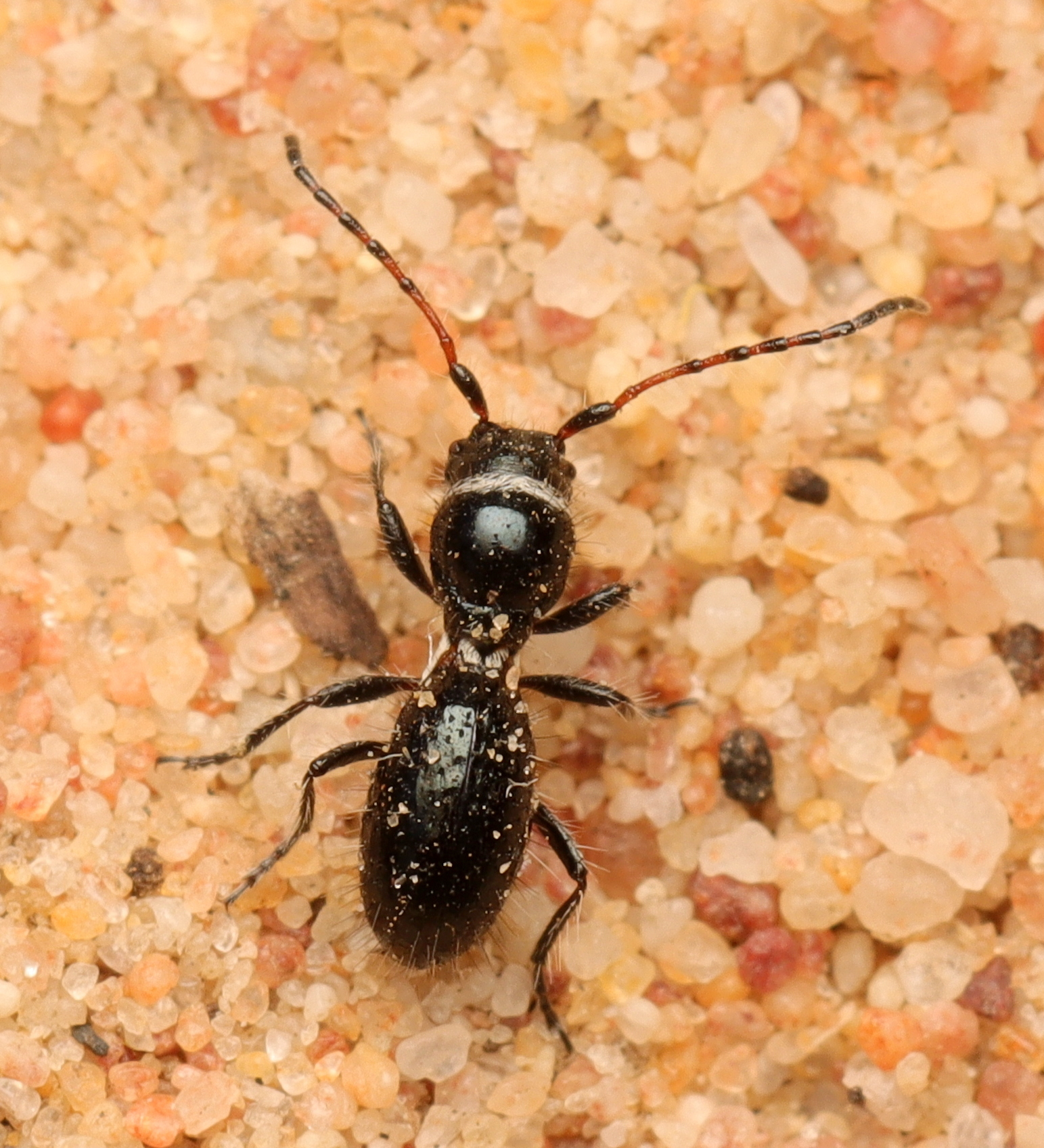

Scientific classification
- Kingdom: Animalia
- Phylum: Arthropoda
- Class: Insecta
- Order: Coleoptera
- Suborder: Polyphaga
- Infraorder: Cucujiformia
- Family: Cerambycidae
- Genus: Stenauxa
- Species: S. exigua

Binomial name
- Stenauxa exigua Aurivillius, 1925

= Stenauxa exigua =

Species of beetle

Stenauxa exigua is a species of beetle in the family Cerambycidae. It was described by Per Olof Christopher Aurivillius in 1925.
