= Parmena aurora =

Scientific classification
- Domain: Eukaryota
- Kingdom: Animalia
- Phylum: Arthropoda
- Class: Insecta
- Order: Coleoptera
- Suborder: Polyphaga
- Infraorder: Cucujiformia
- Family: Cerambycidae
- Genus: Parmena
- Species: P. aurora

Binomial name
- Parmena aurora Danilevsky, 1980

Species of beetle

Parmena aurora is a species of beetle in the family Cerambycidae. It was described by Mikhail Leontievich Danilevsky in 1980. It is known from Azerbaijan.
