= Parmena pontocircassica =

Scientific classification
- Domain: Eukaryota
- Kingdom: Animalia
- Phylum: Arthropoda
- Class: Insecta
- Order: Coleoptera
- Suborder: Polyphaga
- Infraorder: Cucujiformia
- Family: Cerambycidae
- Genus: Parmena
- Species: P. pontocircassica

Binomial name
- Parmena pontocircassica Danilevsky & Miroshnikov, 1985

Species of beetle

Parmena pontocircassica is a species of beetle in the family Cerambycidae. It was described by Mikhail Leontievich Danilevsky and Alexander Ivanovich Miroshnikov in 1985. It is known from Russia, Turkey, Georgia and Ukraine. It feeds on Abies nordmanniana.
