= Mecynome quadrispinosus =

Scientific classification
- Kingdom: Animalia
- Phylum: Arthropoda
- Class: Insecta
- Order: Coleoptera
- Suborder: Polyphaga
- Infraorder: Cucujiformia
- Family: Cerambycidae
- Genus: Mecynome
- Species: M. quadrispinosus

Binomial name
- Mecynome quadrispinosus (Franz, 1954)

Synonyms
- Caudelytra quadrispinosa Franz, 1954

Species of beetle

Mecynome quadrispinosus is a species of beetle in the family Cerambycidae. It was described by Franz in 1954. It is known from El Salvador.
