= Microcleptes aranea =

Scientific classification
- Kingdom: Animalia
- Phylum: Arthropoda
- Class: Insecta
- Order: Coleoptera
- Suborder: Polyphaga
- Infraorder: Cucujiformia
- Family: Cerambycidae
- Genus: Microcleptes
- Species: M. aranea

Binomial name
- Microcleptes aranea Newman, 1840

Synonyms
- Microcleptes araneus Gemminger & Harold, 1873; Microcleptes blanchardi Lacordaire, 1869; Parmena hemisphaerica Blanchard, 1851

Species of beetle

Microcleptes aranea is a species of beetle in the family Cerambycidae. It was described by Newman in 1840. It is known from Chile.
