= Cleptonotus albomaculatus =

Scientific classification
- Kingdom: Animalia
- Phylum: Arthropoda
- Class: Insecta
- Order: Coleoptera
- Suborder: Polyphaga
- Infraorder: Cucujiformia
- Family: Cerambycidae
- Genus: Cleptonotus
- Species: C. albomaculatus

Binomial name
- Cleptonotus albomaculatus (Blanchard in Gay, 1851)

Synonyms
- Microcleptes albomaculatus Fairmaire & Germain, 1859; Parmena albomaculata Blanchard, 1851

Species of beetle

Cleptonotus albomaculatus is a species of beetle in the family Cerambycidae. It was described by Blanchard in Gay in 1851. It is known from Chile.
