= Falsohomaemota =

Scientific classification
- Kingdom: Animalia
- Phylum: Arthropoda
- Class: Insecta
- Order: Coleoptera
- Suborder: Polyphaga
- Infraorder: Cucujiformia
- Family: Cerambycidae
- Tribe: Parmenini
- Genus: Falsohomaemota; Hayashi, 1961

Species
- See text

Genus of beetles

Falsohomaemota is a genus of longhorn beetles of the subfamily Lamiinae, containing the following species:

- Falsohomaemota monteithi Sudre & Vives, 2016
- Falsohomaemota novacaledonica Hayashi, 1961
- Falsohomaemota viridis Sudre, Vives, Mille & Bordon, 2013
