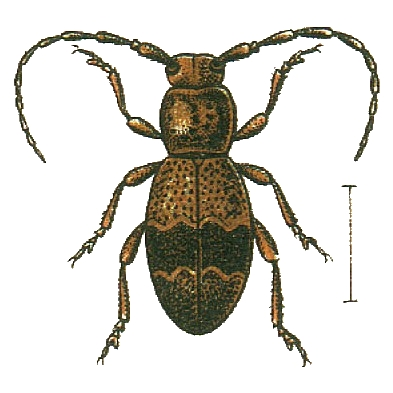

Scientific classification
- Kingdom: Animalia
- Phylum: Arthropoda
- Class: Insecta
- Order: Coleoptera
- Suborder: Polyphaga
- Infraorder: Cucujiformia
- Family: Cerambycidae
- Genus: Parmena
- Species: P. balteus

Binomial name
- Parmena balteus (Linnaeus, 1767)

Synonyms
- Cerambyx balteus Linnaeus, 1767; Parmena balteus var. fasciata (Villers) Baudi, 1889; Parmena fasciata (Villers) Mulsant, 1839

= Parmena balteus =

Species of beetle

Parmena balteus is a species of beetle in the family Cerambycidae. It was described by Carl Linnaeus in 1767, originally under the genus Cerambyx. It is known from Switzerland, France, Italy, and possibly Belgium.

== Varietas ==
- Parmena balteus var. gauthieri Stösklein, 1940
- Parmena balteus var. interrupta Pic, 1891
