= Luzonoparmena habei =

Scientific classification
- Domain: Eukaryota
- Kingdom: Animalia
- Phylum: Arthropoda
- Class: Insecta
- Order: Coleoptera
- Suborder: Polyphaga
- Infraorder: Cucujiformia
- Family: Cerambycidae
- Genus: Luzonoparmena
- Species: L. habei

Binomial name
- Luzonoparmena habei M. Sato & N. Ohbayashi, 1979

Species of beetles

Luzonoparmena habei is a species of beetle in the family Cerambycidae. It was described by M. Sato and N. Ohbayashi in 1979.
