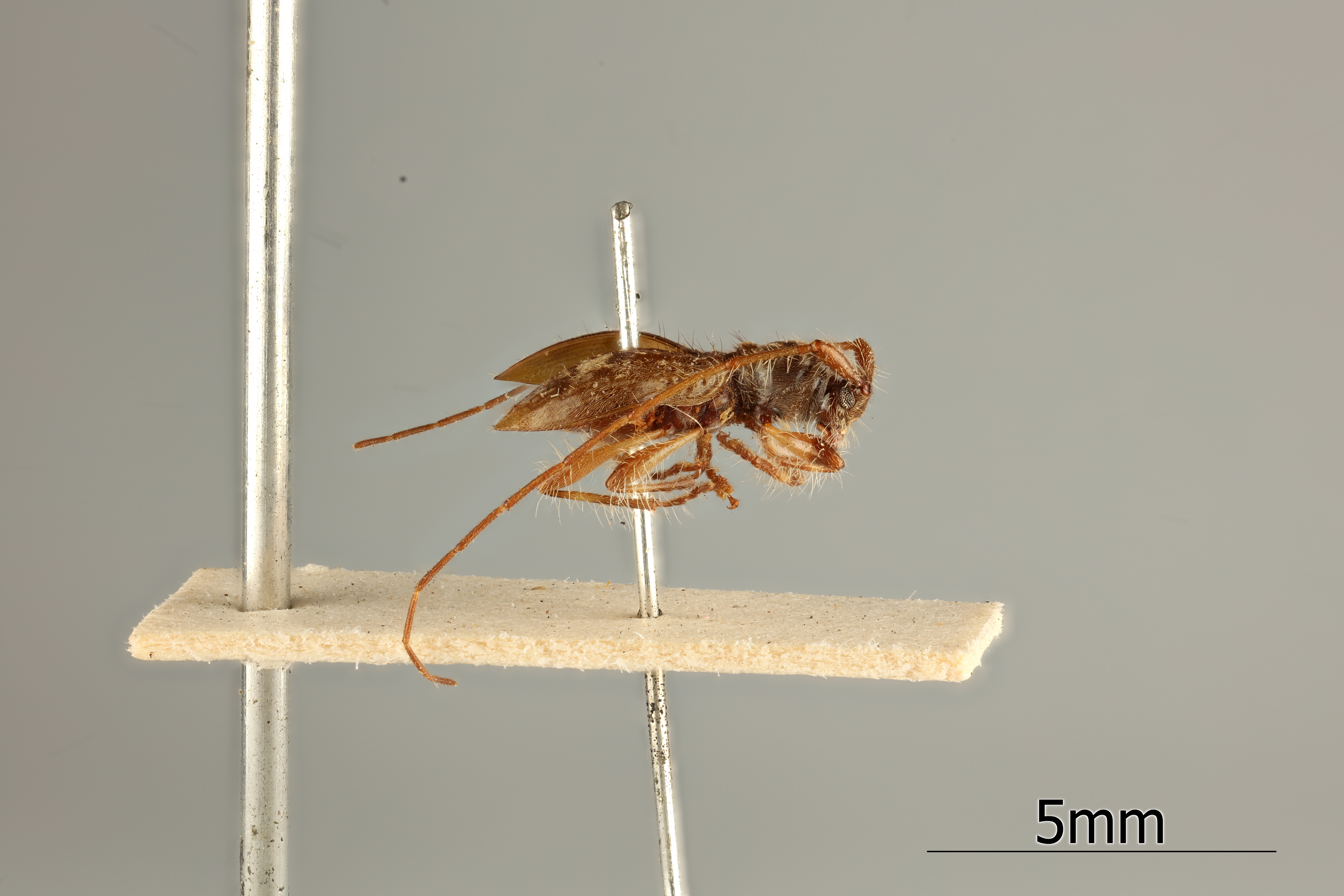

Scientific classification
- Kingdom: Animalia
- Phylum: Arthropoda
- Class: Insecta
- Order: Coleoptera
- Suborder: Polyphaga
- Infraorder: Cucujiformia
- Family: Cerambycidae
- Genus: Tricondyloides
- Species: T. inermis

Binomial name
- Tricondyloides inermis Breuning, 1939

= Tricondyloides inermis =

Species of beetle

Tricondyloides inermis is a species of beetle in the family Cerambycidae. It was described by Stephan von Breuning in 1939.

It is 4.5 mm long and 1.75 mm wide, and its type locality is Mont Panié, New Caledonia.
