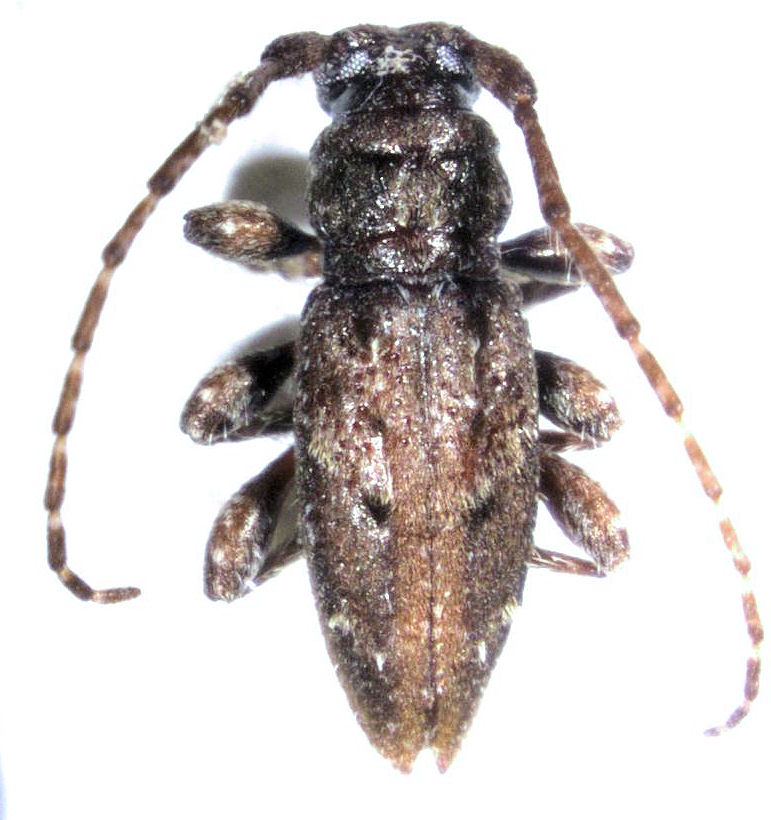

Scientific classification
- Kingdom: Animalia
- Phylum: Arthropoda
- Class: Insecta
- Order: Coleoptera
- Suborder: Polyphaga
- Infraorder: Cucujiformia
- Family: Cerambycidae
- Subfamily: Lamiinae
- Tribe: Parmenini
- Genus: Xylotoloides; Breuning, 1950
- Species: X. huttoni

Binomial name
- Xylotoloides huttoni (Sharp, 1882)

Synonyms
- Species synonymy: Xylotoles huttoni Sharp, 1882

= Xylotoloides =

Genus of beetles

Xylotoloides huttoni is a species of beetle in the family Cerambycidae, and the only species in the genus Xylotoloides. It was described by Sharp in 1882.
