= Spinosomatidia =

Scientific classification
- Kingdom: Animalia
- Phylum: Arthropoda
- Class: Insecta
- Order: Coleoptera
- Suborder: Polyphaga
- Infraorder: Cucujiformia
- Family: Cerambycidae
- Tribe: Parmenini
- Genus: Spinosomatidia; Hunt & Breuning, 1955

Species
- See text

Synonyms
- Odontosoma Breuning, 1950

Genus of beetles

Spinosomatidia is a genus of longhorn beetles of the subfamily Lamiinae, containing the following species:

- Spinosomatidia affinis Breuning, 1981
- Spinosomatidia obesa Hunt & Breuning, 1955
- Spinosomatidia similis Breuning, 1981
- Spinosomatidia tuberipennis Breuning, 1981
