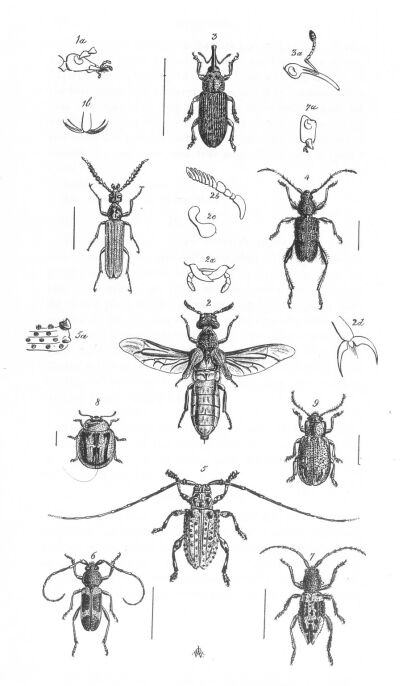
- Palaestrida bicolor, Sitarida hopei, Chalcolampra constricta, and Peltoschema scutifera

Scientific classification
- Kingdom: Animalia
- Phylum: Arthropoda
- Class: Insecta
- Order: Coleoptera
- Suborder: Polyphaga
- Infraorder: Cucujiformia
- Family: Cerambycidae
- Subfamily: Lamiinae
- Tribe: Parmenini
- Genus: Microtragus; White, 1846

Species
- See text

= Microtragus =

Genus of beetles

Microtragus is a genus of longhorn beetles of the subfamily Lamiinae, containing the following species:

- Microtragus arachne Pascoe, 1865
- Microtragus basalis Lea, 1917
- Microtragus bifasciatus Lea, 1917
- Microtragus browni Carter, 1932
- Microtragus cristulatus Aurivillius, 1917
- Microtragus discospinosus Carter, 1932
- Microtragus echinatus Carter, 1926
- Microtragus gazellae Kriesche, 1923
- Microtragus luctuosus (Shuckard, 1838)
- Microtragus mormon Pascoe, 1865
- Microtragus multituberculatus Breuning, 1954
- Microtragus quadrimaculatus Blackburn, 1892
- Microtragus senex White, 1846
- Microtragus tuberculatus Carter, 1934
- Microtragus unicristatus Breuning, 1942
- Microtragus waterhousei Pascoe, 1864
