= Echthistatus =

Scientific classification
- Domain: Eukaryota
- Kingdom: Animalia
- Phylum: Arthropoda
- Class: Insecta
- Order: Coleoptera
- Suborder: Polyphaga
- Infraorder: Cucujiformia
- Family: Cerambycidae
- Tribe: Parmenini
- Genus: Echthistatus; Pascoe, 1862

Species
- See text

Genus of beetles

Echthistatus is a genus of longhorn beetles of the subfamily Lamiinae, containing the following species:

- Echthistatus hawksi (Giesbert, 2001)
- Echthistatus spinulosus (Pascoe, 1862)
