= Luzonoparmena =

Scientific classification
- Domain: Eukaryota
- Kingdom: Animalia
- Phylum: Arthropoda
- Class: Insecta
- Order: Coleoptera
- Suborder: Polyphaga
- Infraorder: Cucujiformia
- Family: Cerambycidae
- Subfamily: Lamiinae
- Tribe: Parmenini
- Genus: Luzonoparmena; Sato & Ohbayashi, 1979

Species
- See text

Genus of beetles

Luzonoparmena is a genus of longhorn beetles of the subfamily Lamiinae, containing the following species:

- Luzonoparmena habei Sato & Ohbayashi, 1979
- Luzonoparmena sierrana Vives, 2015
