= Parmena pubescens =

Scientific classification
- Domain: Eukaryota
- Kingdom: Animalia
- Phylum: Arthropoda
- Class: Insecta
- Order: Coleoptera
- Suborder: Polyphaga
- Infraorder: Cucujiformia
- Family: Cerambycidae
- Genus: Parmena
- Species: P. pubescens

Binomial name
- Parmena pubescens (Dalman, 1817)

Synonyms
- Lamia pubescens Dalman, 1817

Species of beetle

Parmena pubescens is a species of beetle in the family Cerambycidae. It was described by Dalman in 1817, originally under the genus Lamia. It has a wide distribution between Europe and Africa. It feeds on Ficus carica and Nerium oleander.

== Subspecies ==
- Parmena pubescens pilosa (Brullé, 1833)
- Parmena pubescens pubescens (Dalman, 1817)
