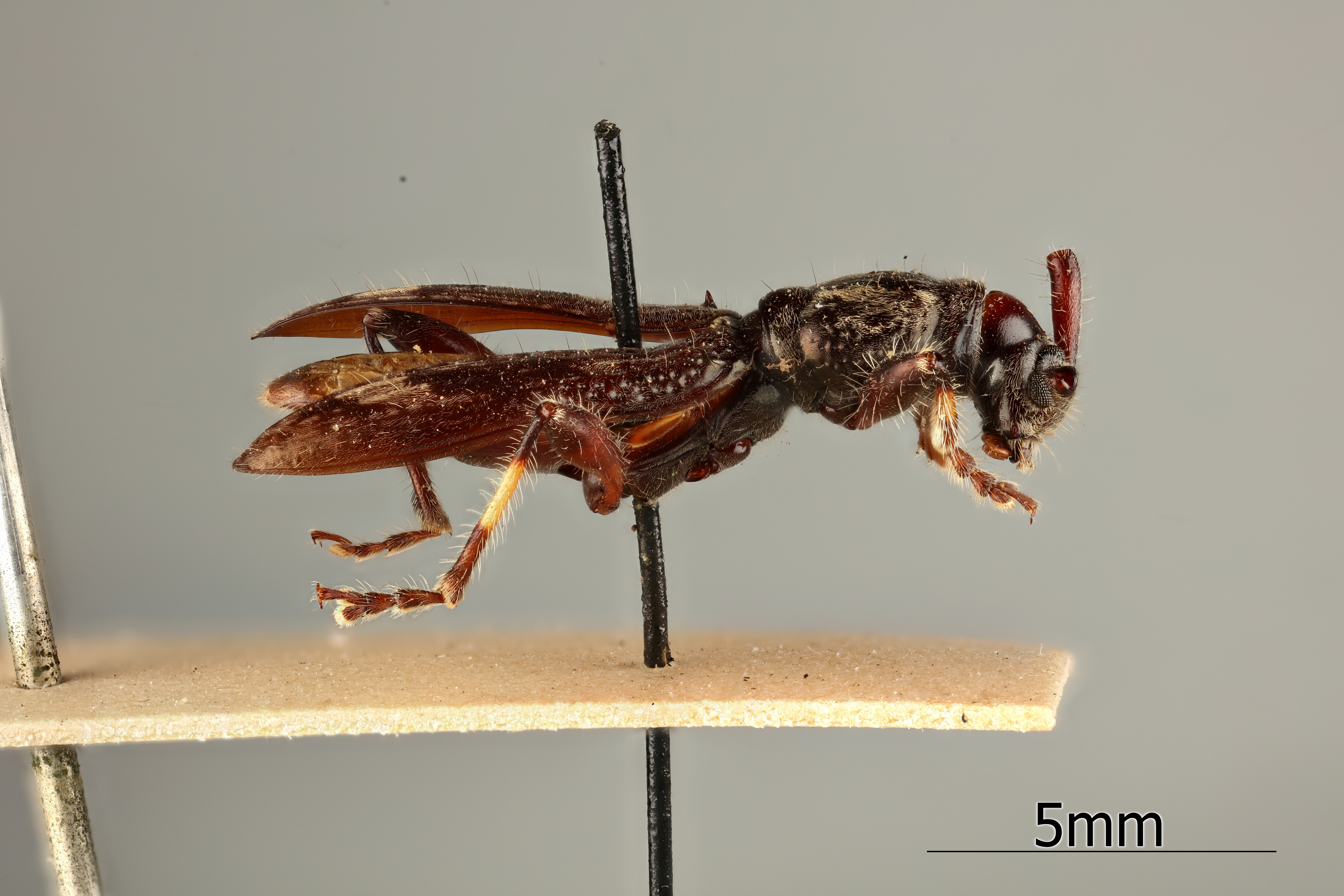
- Tricondyloides elongatus

Scientific classification
- Kingdom: Animalia
- Phylum: Arthropoda
- Class: Insecta
- Order: Coleoptera
- Suborder: Polyphaga
- Infraorder: Cucujiformia
- Family: Cerambycidae
- Genus: Tricondyloides
- Species: T. elongatus

Binomial name
- Tricondyloides elongatus Breuning, 1939

= Tricondyloides elongatus =

Species of beetle

Tricondyloides elongatus is a species of beetle in the family Cerambycidae. It was described by Stephan von Breuning in 1939.

It is 11 mm long and 2.5 mm wide, and its type locality is Plaine des Lacs, New Caledonia.
