= Nanilla globosa =

Scientific classification
- Kingdom: Animalia
- Phylum: Arthropoda
- Clade: Pancrustacea
- Class: Insecta
- Order: Coleoptera
- Suborder: Polyphaga
- Infraorder: Cucujiformia
- Family: Cerambycidae
- Genus: Nanilla
- Species: N. globosa

Binomial name
- Nanilla globosa Zayas, 1975

Species of beetle

Nanilla globosa is a species of beetle in the family Cerambycidae. It was described by Zayas in 1975. It is known from Cuba.
