= Parmena cruciata =

Scientific classification
- Kingdom: Animalia
- Phylum: Arthropoda
- Class: Insecta
- Order: Coleoptera
- Suborder: Polyphaga
- Infraorder: Cucujiformia
- Family: Cerambycidae
- Genus: Parmena
- Species: P. cruciata

Binomial name
- Parmena cruciata Pic, 1912

Synonyms
- Parmena algirica var. cruciata Pic, 1912

Species of beetle

Parmena cruciata is a species of beetle in the family Cerambycidae. It was described by Maurice Pic in 1912. It is known from Spain.
