= Parmena meregallii =

Scientific classification
- Domain: Eukaryota
- Kingdom: Animalia
- Phylum: Arthropoda
- Class: Insecta
- Order: Coleoptera
- Suborder: Polyphaga
- Infraorder: Cucujiformia
- Family: Cerambycidae
- Genus: Parmena
- Species: P. meregallii

Binomial name
- Parmena meregallii Sama, 1984

Synonyms
- Parmena balteus meregallii Sama, 1984

Species of beetle

Parmena meregallii is a species of beetle in the family Cerambycidae. It was described by Sama in 1984. It is known from France and Spain.
