= Plectrura spinicauda =

Scientific classification
- Kingdom: Animalia
- Phylum: Arthropoda
- Class: Insecta
- Order: Coleoptera
- Suborder: Polyphaga
- Infraorder: Cucujiformia
- Family: Cerambycidae
- Genus: Plectrura
- Species: P. spinicauda

Binomial name
- Plectrura spinicauda Motschulsky, 1845

Species of beetle

Plectrura spinicauda is a species of beetle in the family Cerambycidae. It was described by Victor Motschulsky in 1845. It is known from the United States and Canada.
