= Parmenosoma villosa =

Scientific classification
- Domain: Eukaryota
- Kingdom: Animalia
- Phylum: Arthropoda
- Class: Insecta
- Order: Coleoptera
- Suborder: Polyphaga
- Infraorder: Cucujiformia
- Family: Cerambycidae
- Genus: Parmenosoma
- Species: P. villosa

Binomial name
- Parmenosoma villosa (Bates, 1885)

Synonyms
- Parmena villosa Bates, 1885

Species of beetle

Parmenosoma villosa is a species of beetle in the family Cerambycidae. It was described by Henry Walter Bates in 1885. It is known from Mexico.
