= Ipochus fasciatus =

Scientific classification
- Domain: Eukaryota
- Kingdom: Animalia
- Phylum: Arthropoda
- Class: Insecta
- Order: Coleoptera
- Suborder: Polyphaga
- Infraorder: Cucujiformia
- Family: Cerambycidae
- Genus: Ipochus
- Species: I. fasciatus

Binomial name
- Ipochus fasciatus LeConte, 1852

Species of beetle

Ipochus fasciatus is a beetle species belonging to the family Cerambycidae. First described by John Lawrence LeConte in 1852, it is found in Mexico and the United States.
