= Parmenosoma griseum =

Scientific classification
- Kingdom: Animalia
- Phylum: Arthropoda
- Class: Insecta
- Order: Coleoptera
- Suborder: Polyphaga
- Infraorder: Cucujiformia
- Family: Cerambycidae
- Genus: Parmenosoma
- Species: P. griseum

Binomial name
- Parmenosoma griseum Schaeffer, 1908

Species of beetle

Parmenosoma griseum is a beetle species in the Cerambycidae family. It was described by Schaeffer in 1908. It is known from the United States.
