= Mesolita pascoei =

Scientific classification
- Domain: Eukaryota
- Kingdom: Animalia
- Phylum: Arthropoda
- Class: Insecta
- Order: Coleoptera
- Suborder: Polyphaga
- Infraorder: Cucujiformia
- Family: Cerambycidae
- Genus: Mesolita
- Species: M. pascoei

Binomial name
- Mesolita pascoei van der Poll, 1892

Species of beetle

Mesolita pascoei is a species of beetle in the family Cerambycidae. It was described by van der Poll in 1892. It is known from Australia.
