= Sinomimovelleda =

Scientific classification
- Domain: Eukaryota
- Kingdom: Animalia
- Phylum: Arthropoda
- Class: Insecta
- Order: Coleoptera
- Suborder: Polyphaga
- Infraorder: Cucujiformia
- Family: Cerambycidae
- Tribe: Parmenini
- Genus: Sinomimovelleda; Chiang, 1963

Species
- See text

Genus of beetles

Sinomimovelleda is a genus of longhorn beetles of the subfamily Lamiinae, containing the following species:

- Sinomimovelleda chemini Gouverneur, 2015
- Sinomimovelleda dentihumeralis Chiang, 1963
