= Microtragus tuberculatus =

Scientific classification
- Domain: Eukaryota
- Kingdom: Animalia
- Phylum: Arthropoda
- Class: Insecta
- Order: Coleoptera
- Suborder: Polyphaga
- Infraorder: Cucujiformia
- Family: Cerambycidae
- Genus: Microtragus
- Species: M. tuberculatus

Binomial name
- Microtragus tuberculatus Carter, 1934

Species of beetle

Microtragus tuberculatus is an Australian species of beetle in the family Cerambycidae, which was described by Carter in 1934.
