= Dorcadida walkeri =

Scientific classification
- Domain: Eukaryota
- Kingdom: Animalia
- Phylum: Arthropoda
- Class: Insecta
- Order: Coleoptera
- Suborder: Polyphaga
- Infraorder: Cucujiformia
- Family: Cerambycidae
- Genus: Dorcadida
- Species: D. walkeri

Binomial name
- Dorcadida walkeri Gahan, 1893

Species of beetle

Dorcadida walkeri is a species of beetle in the family Cerambycidae. It was described by Charles Joseph Gahan in 1893. It is known from Australia.
