= Stenauxa =

Scientific classification
- Domain: Eukaryota
- Kingdom: Animalia
- Phylum: Arthropoda
- Class: Insecta
- Order: Coleoptera
- Suborder: Polyphaga
- Infraorder: Cucujiformia
- Family: Cerambycidae
- Subfamily: Lamiinae
- Tribe: Parmenini
- Genus: Stenauxa; Aurivillius, 1925

Species
- See text

Genus of beetles

Stenauxa is a genus of longhorn beetles of the subfamily Lamiinae, containing the following species:

- Stenauxa exigua Aurivillius, 1925
- Stenauxa fasciata Breuning & Téocchi, 1983
