= Microtragus bifasciatus =

Scientific classification
- Domain: Eukaryota
- Kingdom: Animalia
- Phylum: Arthropoda
- Class: Insecta
- Order: Coleoptera
- Suborder: Polyphaga
- Infraorder: Cucujiformia
- Family: Cerambycidae
- Genus: Microtragus
- Species: M. bifasciatus

Binomial name
- Microtragus bifasciatus Lea, 1917

Species of beetle

Microtragus bifasciatus is a species of beetle in the family Cerambycidae. It was described by Lea in 1917. It is known from Australia.
