= Parmena subpubescens =

Scientific classification
- Domain: Eukaryota
- Kingdom: Animalia
- Phylum: Arthropoda
- Class: Insecta
- Order: Coleoptera
- Suborder: Polyphaga
- Infraorder: Cucujiformia
- Family: Cerambycidae
- Genus: Parmena
- Species: P. subpubescens

Binomial name
- Parmena subpubescens Hellrigl, 1971

Species of beetle

Parmena subpubescens is a species of beetle in the family Cerambycidae. It was described by Hellrigl in 1971. It is known from Sardinia, Italy, and Sicily.
