= Falsohomaemota novacaledonica =

Scientific classification
- Kingdom: Animalia
- Phylum: Arthropoda
- Class: Insecta
- Order: Coleoptera
- Suborder: Polyphaga
- Infraorder: Cucujiformia
- Family: Cerambycidae
- Genus: Falsohomaemota
- Species: F. novacaledonica

Binomial name
- Falsohomaemota novacaledonica Hayashi, 1961

Synonyms
- Coresthetida Breuning, 1975

Genus of beetles

Falsohomaemota novacaledonica is a species of beetle in the family Cerambycidae. It was described by Hayashi in 1961.
