= Ipochus =

Scientific classification
- Kingdom: Animalia
- Phylum: Arthropoda
- Class: Insecta
- Order: Coleoptera
- Suborder: Polyphaga
- Infraorder: Cucujiformia
- Family: Cerambycidae
- Subfamily: Lamiinae
- Tribe: Parmenini
- Genus: Ipochus; LeConte, 1852

Species
- See text

Genus of beetles

Ipochus is a genus of longhorn beetles of the subfamily Lamiinae, containing the following species:

- Ipochus fasciatus LeConte, 1852
- Ipochus insularis Blaisdell, 1925
