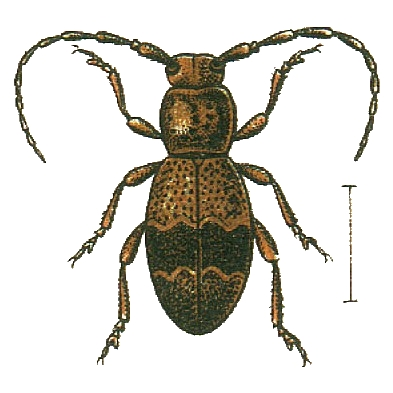
- Parmena balteus
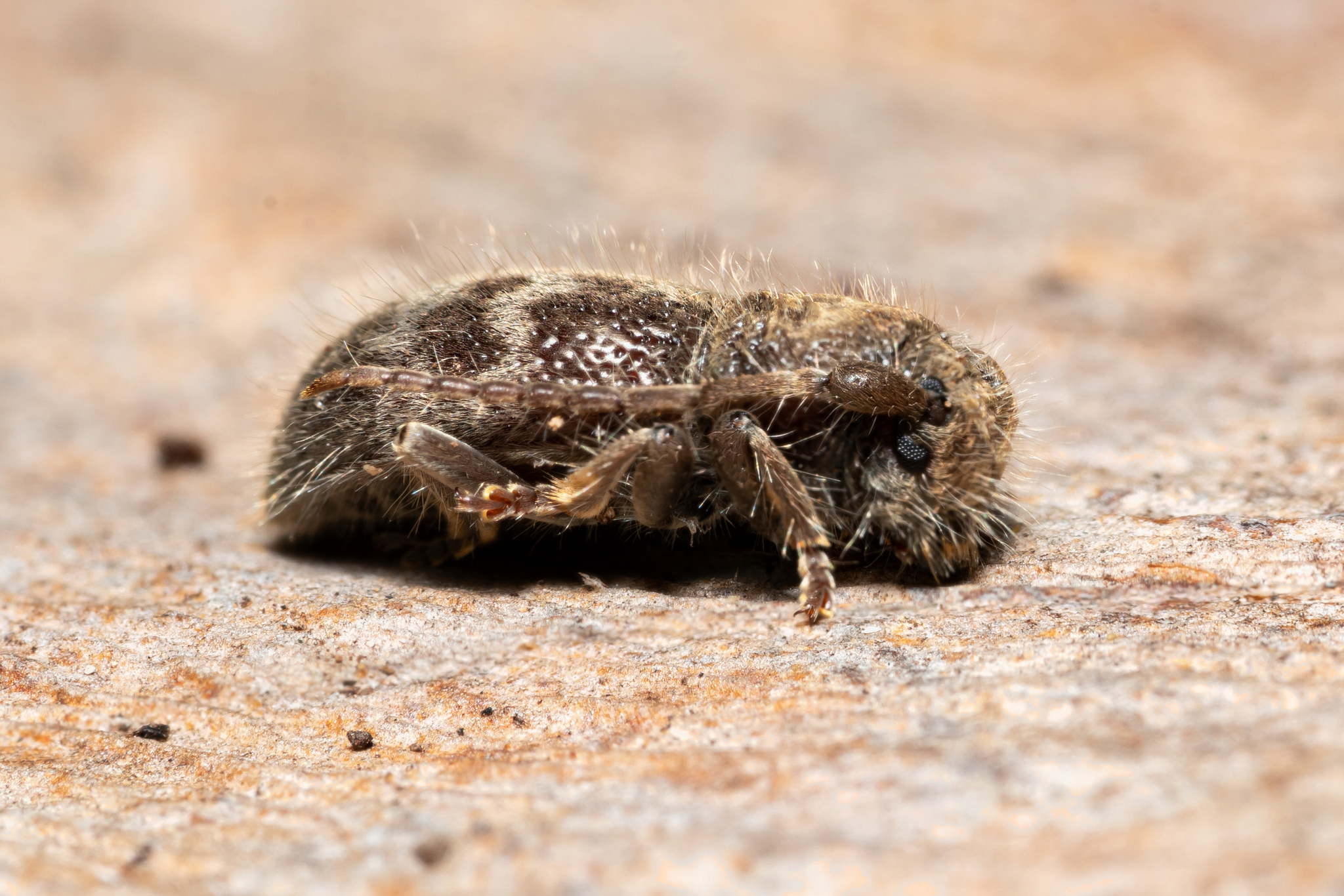
- Parmena pubescens

Scientific classification
- Kingdom: Animalia
- Phylum: Arthropoda
- Class: Insecta
- Order: Coleoptera
- Suborder: Polyphaga
- Infraorder: Cucujiformia
- Family: Cerambycidae
- Subfamily: Lamiinae
- Tribe: Parmenini
- Genus: Parmena; Dejean, 1821

Species
- See text

= Parmena =

Genus of beetles

Parmena is a genus of longhorn beetles that belong to the subfamily Lamiinae.

== Taxonomy ==
It containing the following species:

- Parmena algirica Laporte de Castelnau, 1840
- Parmena aurora Danilevsky, 1980
- Parmena balearica Vives, 1998
- Parmena balteus (Linnaeus, 1767)
- Parmena bialookii Danilevsky, 2017
- Parmena bicincta (Kuster, 1849)
- Parmena cruciata Pic, 1912
- Parmena europaea Danilevsky, 2017
- Parmena istanbulensis Danilevsky & Hizal, 2017
- Parmena lukati Sama, 1994
- Parmena meregallii Sama, 1984
- Parmena mutilloides Pesarini & Sabbadini, 1992
- Parmena novaki Sama, 1997
- Parmena pontocircassica Danilevsky & Miroshnikov, 1985
- Parmena pubescens (Dalman, 1817)
- Parmena slamai Sama, 1986
- Parmena soldatii Cocquempot, 2020
- Parmena solieri Mulsant, 1839
- Parmena striatopunctata Sama, 1994
- Parmena subpubescens Hellrigl, 1971
- Parmena unifasciata (Rossi, 1790)
