= Stychoides =

Scientific classification
- Kingdom: Animalia
- Phylum: Arthropoda
- Class: Insecta
- Order: Coleoptera
- Suborder: Polyphaga
- Infraorder: Cucujiformia
- Family: Cerambycidae
- Subfamily: Lamiinae
- Tribe: Parmenini
- Genus: Stychoides; Breuning, 1940
- Species: S. strandiellus

Binomial name
- Stychoides strandiellus Breuning, 1940

Genus of beetles

Stychoides strandiellus is a species of beetle in the family Cerambycidae, and the only species in the genus Stychoides. It was described by Stephan von Breuning in 1940.
