= Mesolita lineolata =

Scientific classification
- Domain: Eukaryota
- Kingdom: Animalia
- Phylum: Arthropoda
- Class: Insecta
- Order: Coleoptera
- Suborder: Polyphaga
- Infraorder: Cucujiformia
- Family: Cerambycidae
- Genus: Mesolita
- Species: M. lineolata

Binomial name
- Mesolita lineolata Pascoe, 1862

Species of beetle

Mesolita lineolata is a species of beetle in the family Cerambycidae. It was described by Francis Polkinghorne Pascoe in 1862. It is known from Australia.
