= Mesolita =

Scientific classification
- Domain: Eukaryota
- Kingdom: Animalia
- Phylum: Arthropoda
- Class: Insecta
- Order: Coleoptera
- Suborder: Polyphaga
- Infraorder: Cucujiformia
- Family: Cerambycidae
- Tribe: Parmenini
- Genus: Mesolita; Pascoe, 1862

Species
- See text

Genus of beetles

Mesolita is a genus of longhorn beetles of the subfamily Lamiinae, containing the following species:

- Mesolita alternata Carter, 1929
- Mesolita antennalis Carter, 1929
- Mesolita ephippiata Lea, 1918
- Mesolita inermis van der Poll, 1892
- Mesolita interrupta Lea, 1918
- Mesolita lineolata Pascoe, 1862
- Mesolita myrmecophila Lea, 1918
- Mesolita pascoei van der Poll, 1892
- Mesolita scutellata Lea, 1918
- Mesolita simplicicollis Aurivillius, 1920
- Mesolita transversa Pascoe, 1862
