= Microtragus senex =

Scientific classification
- Domain: Eukaryota
- Kingdom: Animalia
- Phylum: Arthropoda
- Class: Insecta
- Order: Coleoptera
- Suborder: Polyphaga
- Infraorder: Cucujiformia
- Family: Cerambycidae
- Genus: Microtragus
- Species: M. senex

Binomial name
- Microtragus senex White, 1846

Species of beetle

Microtragus senex is a species of beetle in the family Cerambycidae. It was described by White in 1846. It is known from Australia.
