= Adriopea =

Scientific classification
- Domain: Eukaryota
- Kingdom: Animalia
- Phylum: Arthropoda
- Class: Insecta
- Order: Coleoptera
- Suborder: Polyphaga
- Infraorder: Cucujiformia
- Family: Cerambycidae
- Tribe: Parmenini
- Genus: Adriopea; Broun, 1910
- Species: A. pallidata

Binomial name
- Adriopea pallidata Broun, 1910

Genus of beetles

Adriopea pallidata is a species of beetle in the family Cerambycidae, and the only species in the genus Adriopea. It was described by Thomas Broun in 1910.
