= Enotocleptes =

Scientific classification
- Kingdom: Animalia
- Phylum: Arthropoda
- Class: Insecta
- Order: Coleoptera
- Suborder: Polyphaga
- Infraorder: Cucujiformia
- Family: Cerambycidae
- Tribe: Parmenini
- Genus: Enotocleptes; Breuning, 1940

Species
- See text

Genus of beetles

Enotocleptes is a genus of longhorn beetles of the subfamily Lamiinae, containing the following species:

- Enotocleptes denticollis (Fauvel, 1906)
- Enotocleptes intermicollis Breuning, 1940
