= Ceraegidion dorrigoensis =

Scientific classification
- Domain: Eukaryota
- Kingdom: Animalia
- Phylum: Arthropoda
- Class: Insecta
- Order: Coleoptera
- Suborder: Polyphaga
- Infraorder: Cucujiformia
- Family: Cerambycidae
- Genus: Ceraegidion
- Species: C. dorrigoensis

Binomial name
- Ceraegidion dorrigoensis McKeown, 1937

Species of beetle

Ceraegidion dorrigoensis is a species of beetle in the family Cerambycidae. It was described by McKeown in 1937. It is known from Australia.
