= Tricondyloides armatus =

Scientific classification
- Domain: Eukaryota
- Kingdom: Animalia
- Phylum: Arthropoda
- Class: Insecta
- Order: Coleoptera
- Suborder: Polyphaga
- Infraorder: Cucujiformia
- Family: Cerambycidae
- Genus: Tricondyloides
- Species: T. armatus

Binomial name
- Tricondyloides armatus Montrouzier, 1861

Species of beetle

Tricondyloides armatus is a species of beetle in the family Cerambycidae. It was described by Xavier Montrouzier in 1861.
