= Somatocleptes ovalis =

Scientific classification
- Kingdom: Animalia
- Phylum: Arthropoda
- Class: Insecta
- Order: Coleoptera
- Suborder: Polyphaga
- Infraorder: Cucujiformia
- Family: Cerambycidae
- Genus: Somatocleptes
- Species: S. ovalis

Binomial name
- Somatocleptes ovalis Breuning, 1947

Species of beetle

Somatocleptes ovalis is a species of beetle in the family Cerambycidae. It was described by Stephan von Breuning in 1947.
