= Cleptonotus subarmatus =

Scientific classification
- Kingdom: Animalia
- Phylum: Arthropoda
- Class: Insecta
- Order: Coleoptera
- Suborder: Polyphaga
- Infraorder: Cucujiformia
- Family: Cerambycidae
- Genus: Cleptonotus
- Species: C. subarmatus

Binomial name
- Cleptonotus subarmatus (Fairmaire & Germain, 1859)

Species of beetle

Cleptonotus subarmatus is a species of beetle in the family Cerambycidae. It was described by Léon Fairmaire and Germain 1859. It is known from Chile.
