= Macrocleptes =

Scientific classification
- Kingdom: Animalia
- Phylum: Arthropoda
- Class: Insecta
- Order: Coleoptera
- Suborder: Polyphaga
- Infraorder: Cucujiformia
- Family: Cerambycidae
- Subfamily: Lamiinae
- Tribe: Parmenini
- Genus: Macrocleptes; Breuning, 1947

Species
- See text

Genus of beetles

Macrocleptes is a genus of longhorn beetles of the subfamily Lamiinae, containing the following species:

- Macrocleptes caledonicus Breuning, 1947
- Macrocleptes tuberculipennis Breuning, 1978
