= Parmena striatopunctata =

Scientific classification
- Kingdom: Animalia
- Phylum: Arthropoda
- Class: Insecta
- Order: Coleoptera
- Suborder: Polyphaga
- Infraorder: Cucujiformia
- Family: Cerambycidae
- Genus: Parmena
- Species: P. striatopunctata

Binomial name
- Parmena striatopunctata Sama, 1994

Synonyms
- Parmena samai Özdikmen, 2021; Parmena sericata Sama, 1996

Species of beetle

Parmena striatopunctata is a species of beetle in the family Cerambycidae. It was described by Sama in 1994. It is known from Turkey.
