= Parmena balearica =

Scientific classification
- Domain: Eukaryota
- Kingdom: Animalia
- Phylum: Arthropoda
- Class: Insecta
- Order: Coleoptera
- Suborder: Polyphaga
- Infraorder: Cucujiformia
- Family: Cerambycidae
- Genus: Parmena
- Species: P. balearica

Binomial name
- Parmena balearica Vives, 1998

Species of beetle

Parmena balearica is a species of beetle in the family Cerambycidae. It was described by Vives in 1998. It is known from the Balearic Islands.

== Subspecies ==
- Parmena balearica balearica Vives, 1998
- Parmena balearica minoricensis Vives, 1998
