= Parmena mutilloides =

Scientific classification
- Domain: Eukaryota
- Kingdom: Animalia
- Phylum: Arthropoda
- Class: Insecta
- Order: Coleoptera
- Suborder: Polyphaga
- Infraorder: Cucujiformia
- Family: Cerambycidae
- Genus: Parmena
- Species: P. mutilloides

Binomial name
- Parmena mutilloides Pesarini & Sabbadini, 1992

Species of beetle

Parmena mutilloides is a species of beetle in the family Cerambycidae. It was described by Pesarini and Sabbadini in 1992. It is known from Turkey.
