= Parmena novaki =

Scientific classification
- Domain: Eukaryota
- Kingdom: Animalia
- Phylum: Arthropoda
- Class: Insecta
- Order: Coleoptera
- Suborder: Polyphaga
- Infraorder: Cucujiformia
- Family: Cerambycidae
- Genus: Parmena
- Species: P. novaki

Binomial name
- Parmena novaki Sama, 1997

Species of beetle

Parmena novaki is a species of beetle in the family Cerambycidae. It was described by Sama in 1997. It is known from Greece.
