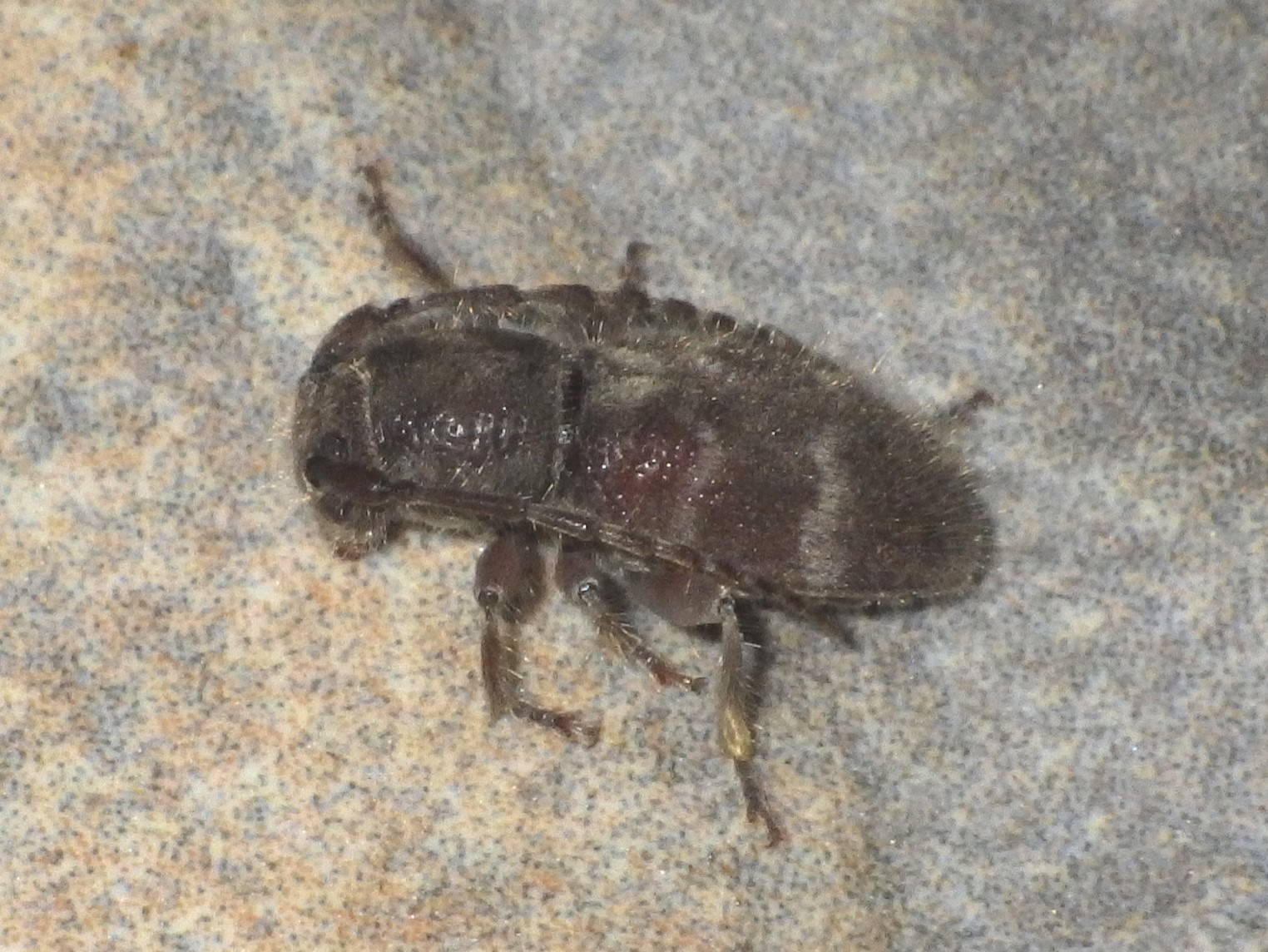

Scientific classification
- Kingdom: Animalia
- Phylum: Arthropoda
- Class: Insecta
- Order: Coleoptera
- Suborder: Polyphaga
- Infraorder: Cucujiformia
- Family: Cerambycidae
- Genus: Parmena
- Species: P. slamai

Binomial name
- Parmena slamai Sama, 1986

= Parmena slamai =

Species of beetle

Parmena slamai is a species of beetle in the family Cerambycidae. It is endemic to Crete.
