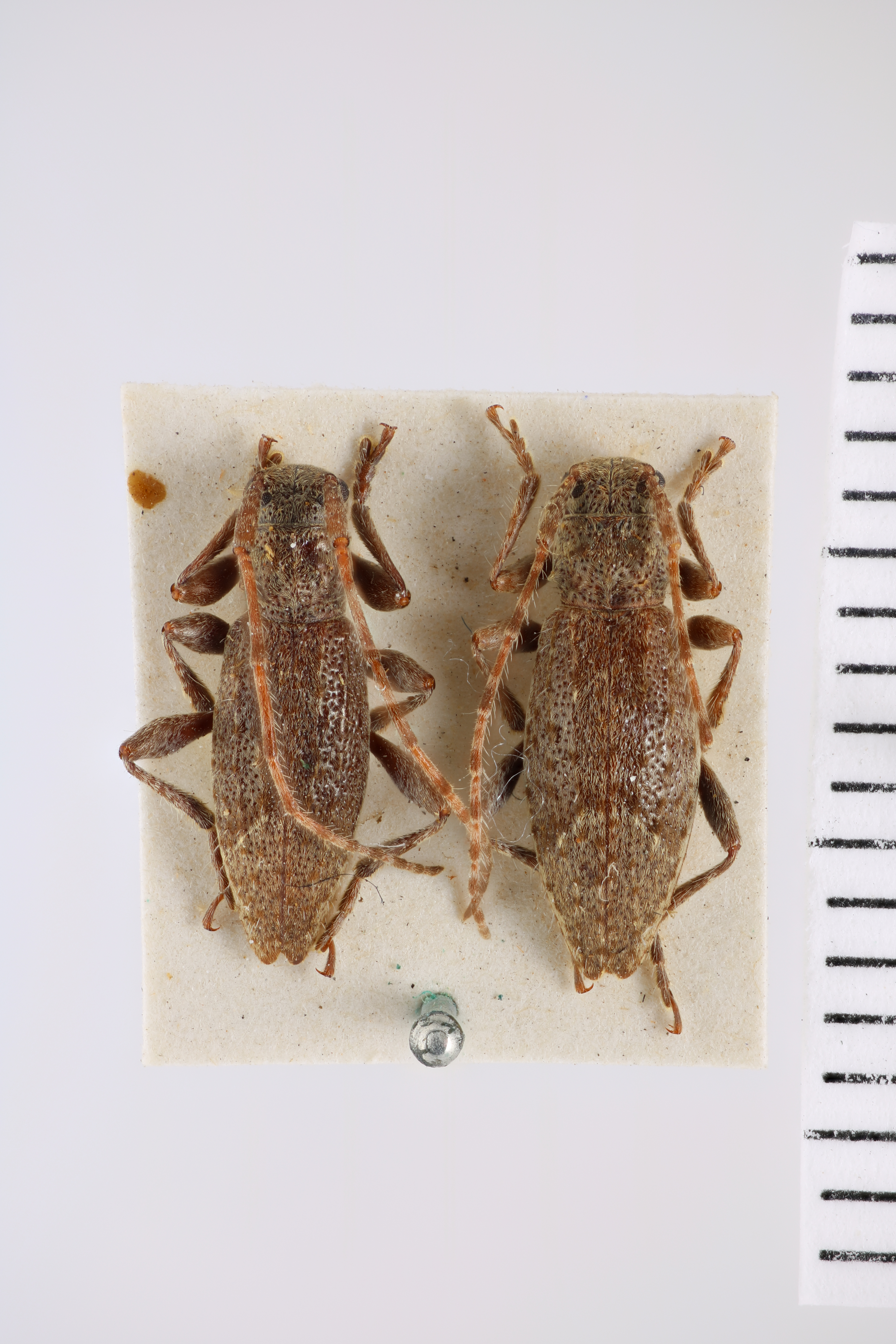
- Mecynome Aenescens

Scientific classification
- Domain: Eukaryota
- Kingdom: Animalia
- Phylum: Arthropoda
- Class: Insecta
- Order: Coleoptera
- Suborder: Polyphaga
- Infraorder: Cucujiformia
- Family: Cerambycidae
- Genus: Mecynome
- Species: M. aenescens

Binomial name
- Mecynome aenescens Bates, 1885

= Mecynome aenescens =

Species of beetle

Mecynome aenescens is a species of beetle in the family Cerambycidae. It was described by Henry Walter Bates in 1885. It is known from Guatemala, Mexico and El Salvador.
