= Inermoparmena =

Scientific classification
- Kingdom: Animalia
- Phylum: Arthropoda
- Class: Insecta
- Order: Coleoptera
- Suborder: Polyphaga
- Infraorder: Cucujiformia
- Family: Cerambycidae
- Subfamily: Lamiinae
- Tribe: Parmenini
- Genus: Inermoparmena; Breuning, 1971
- Species: I. besucheti

Binomial name
- Inermoparmena besucheti Breuning, 1971

Genus of beetles

Inermoparmena besucheti is a species of beetle in the family Cerambycidae, and the only species in the genus Inermoparmena. It was described by Stephan von Breuning in 1971.
