= Enotocleptes denticollis =

Scientific classification
- Domain: Eukaryota
- Kingdom: Animalia
- Phylum: Arthropoda
- Class: Insecta
- Order: Coleoptera
- Suborder: Polyphaga
- Infraorder: Cucujiformia
- Family: Cerambycidae
- Genus: Enotocleptes
- Species: E. denticollis

Binomial name
- Enotocleptes denticollis (Fauvel, 1906)

Synonyms
- Microcleptes denticollis Fauvel, 1906

Species of beetle

Enotocleptes denticollis is a species of beetle in the family Cerambycidae. It was described by Fauvel in 1906.
