= Paradeucalion =

Scientific classification
- Kingdom: Animalia
- Phylum: Arthropoda
- Clade: Pancrustacea
- Class: Insecta
- Order: Coleoptera
- Suborder: Polyphaga
- Infraorder: Cucujiformia
- Family: Cerambycidae
- Tribe: Parmenini
- Genus: Paradeucalion; Breuning, 1950

Genus of beetles

Paradeucalion is a beetle genus in the family Cerambycidae described by Stephan von Breuning in 1950. Its contains the following species:

- Paradeucalion desertarum Wollaston, 1854
- Paradeucalion maderense Krátký & Aguiar, 2019
