= Sinomimovelleda dentihumeralis =

Scientific classification
- Domain: Eukaryota
- Kingdom: Animalia
- Phylum: Arthropoda
- Class: Insecta
- Order: Coleoptera
- Suborder: Polyphaga
- Infraorder: Cucujiformia
- Family: Cerambycidae
- Genus: Sinomimovelleda
- Species: S. dentihumeralis

Binomial name
- Sinomimovelleda dentihumeralis Chiang, 1963

Genus of beetles

Sinomimovelleda dentihumeralis is a species of beetle in the family Cerambycidae. It was described by Chiang in 1963.
