= Parmena bicincta =

Scientific classification
- Kingdom: Animalia
- Phylum: Arthropoda
- Class: Insecta
- Order: Coleoptera
- Suborder: Polyphaga
- Infraorder: Cucujiformia
- Family: Cerambycidae
- Genus: Parmena
- Species: P. bicincta

Binomial name
- Parmena bicincta (Kuster, 1849)

Species of beetle

Parmena bicincta is a species of beetle in the family Cerambycidae. It was described by Kuster in 1849. It is known from Croatia, Albania, Montenegro, and Bosnia and Herzegovina.
