= Microsomatidia =

Scientific classification
- Domain: Eukaryota
- Kingdom: Animalia
- Phylum: Arthropoda
- Class: Insecta
- Order: Coleoptera
- Suborder: Polyphaga
- Infraorder: Cucujiformia
- Family: Cerambycidae
- Subfamily: Lamiinae
- Tribe: Parmenini
- Genus: Microsomatidia; Sudre, 2001
- Species: M. reticulata

Binomial name
- Microsomatidia reticulata Sudre, 2001

Genus of beetles

Microsomatidia reticulata is a species of beetle in the family Cerambycidae, and the only species in the genus Microsomatidia. It was described by Sudre in 2001.
