= Plectrura =

Scientific classification
- Kingdom: Animalia
- Phylum: Arthropoda
- Class: Insecta
- Order: Coleoptera
- Suborder: Polyphaga
- Infraorder: Cucujiformia
- Family: Cerambycidae
- Tribe: Parmenini
- Genus: Plectrura; Motschulsky, 1845

Species
- See text

Genus of beetles

Plectrura is a genus of longhorn beetles of the subfamily Lamiinae, containing the following species:

subgenus Phlyctidola

- Plectrura metallica (Bates, 1884)

subgenus Plectrura

- Plectrura spinicauda Motschulsky, 1845
