= Parmenosoma =

Scientific classification
- Domain: Eukaryota
- Kingdom: Animalia
- Phylum: Arthropoda
- Class: Insecta
- Order: Coleoptera
- Suborder: Polyphaga
- Infraorder: Cucujiformia
- Family: Cerambycidae
- Tribe: Parmenini
- Genus: Parmenosoma; Schaeffer, 1908

Species
- See text

Genus of beetles

Parmenosoma is a genus of longhorn beetles of the subfamily Lamiinae, containing the following species:

- Parmenosoma griseum Schaeffer, 1908
- Parmenosoma villosa (Bates, 1885)
