= Echthistatus hawksi =

Scientific classification
- Domain: Eukaryota
- Kingdom: Animalia
- Phylum: Arthropoda
- Class: Insecta
- Order: Coleoptera
- Suborder: Polyphaga
- Infraorder: Cucujiformia
- Family: Cerambycidae
- Genus: Echthistatus
- Species: E. hawksi

Binomial name
- Echthistatus hawksi (Giesbert, 2001)

Synonyms
- Edechthistatus hawksi (Giesbert, 2001); Parechthistatus hawksi Giesbert, 2001

Species of beetle

Echthistatus hawksi is a species of beetle in the family Cerambycidae. It was described by Giesbert in 2001. It is known from Honduras.
