= Nanilla delauneyi =

Scientific classification
- Domain: Eukaryota
- Kingdom: Animalia
- Phylum: Arthropoda
- Class: Insecta
- Order: Coleoptera
- Suborder: Polyphaga
- Infraorder: Cucujiformia
- Family: Cerambycidae
- Genus: Nanilla
- Species: N. delauneyi

Binomial name
- Nanilla delauneyi Fleutiaux & Sallé, 1889

Species of beetle

Nanilla delauneyi is a species of beetle in the family Cerambycidae. It was described by Fleutiaux and Sallé in 1889. It is known from Guadeloupe.
