= Coresthetopsis =

Scientific classification
- Kingdom: Animalia
- Phylum: Arthropoda
- Class: Insecta
- Order: Coleoptera
- Suborder: Polyphaga
- Infraorder: Cucujiformia
- Family: Cerambycidae
- Tribe: Parmenini
- Genus: Coresthetopsis; Breuning, 1940

Species
- See text

Genus of beetles

Coresthetopsis is a genus of longhorn beetles of the subfamily Lamiinae, containing the following species:

- Coresthetopsis arachne (Fauvel, 1906)
- Coresthetopsis proxima Breuning, 1940
