= Microtragus cristulatus =

Scientific classification
- Domain: Eukaryota
- Kingdom: Animalia
- Phylum: Arthropoda
- Class: Insecta
- Order: Coleoptera
- Suborder: Polyphaga
- Infraorder: Cucujiformia
- Family: Cerambycidae
- Genus: Microtragus
- Species: M. cristulatus

Binomial name
- Microtragus cristulatus Aurivillius, 1917

Species of beetle

Microtragus cristulatus is a species of beetle in the family Cerambycidae. It was described by Per Olof Christopher Aurivillius in 1917 and is known from Australia.
