= Tangavelleda =

Scientific classification
- Domain: Eukaryota
- Kingdom: Animalia
- Phylum: Arthropoda
- Class: Insecta
- Order: Coleoptera
- Suborder: Polyphaga
- Infraorder: Cucujiformia
- Family: Cerambycidae
- Subfamily: Lamiinae
- Tribe: Parmenini
- Genus: Tangavelleda; Téocchi, 1997
- Species: T. tanzanicola

Binomial name
- Tangavelleda tanzanicola Téocchi, 1997

Genus of beetles

Tangavelleda tanzanicola is a species of beetle in the family Cerambycidae, and the only species in the genus Tangavelleda. It was described by Téocchi in 1997.
