= Stenauxa fasciata =

Scientific classification
- Kingdom: Animalia
- Phylum: Arthropoda
- Class: Insecta
- Order: Coleoptera
- Suborder: Polyphaga
- Infraorder: Cucujiformia
- Family: Cerambycidae
- Genus: Stenauxa
- Species: S. fasciata

Binomial name
- Stenauxa fasciata Breuning & Téocchi, 1983

Synonyms
- Stenauxa fasciata m. anterufa Téocchi, 1991

Species of beetle

Stenauxa fasciata is a species of beetle in the family Cerambycidae. It was described by Stephan von Breuning and Pierre Téocchi in 1983.
