= Spinosomatidia obesa =

Scientific classification
- Kingdom: Animalia
- Phylum: Arthropoda
- Class: Insecta
- Order: Coleoptera
- Suborder: Polyphaga
- Infraorder: Cucujiformia
- Family: Cerambycidae
- Genus: Spinosomatidia
- Species: S. obesa

Binomial name
- Spinosomatidia obesa Hunt & Breuning, 1955

Genus of beetles

Spinosomatidia obesa is a species of beetle in the family Cerambycidae, and the only species in the genus Spinosomatidia. It was described by Hunt and Stephan von Breuning in 1955.
