= Parmena algirica =

Scientific classification
- Domain: Eukaryota
- Kingdom: Animalia
- Phylum: Arthropoda
- Class: Insecta
- Order: Coleoptera
- Suborder: Polyphaga
- Infraorder: Cucujiformia
- Family: Cerambycidae
- Genus: Parmena
- Species: P. algirica

Binomial name
- Parmena algirica Laporte de Castelnau, 1840

Synonyms
- Parmena pubescens algirica (Laporte de Castelnau)

Species of beetle

Parmena algirica is a species of beetle in the family Cerambycidae. It was described by Laporte de Castelnau in 1840. It is known from Morocco, Algeria, and Sicily, and was introduced into Sardinia.
