= Parmena solieri =

Scientific classification
- Domain: Eukaryota
- Kingdom: Animalia
- Phylum: Arthropoda
- Class: Insecta
- Order: Coleoptera
- Suborder: Polyphaga
- Infraorder: Cucujiformia
- Family: Cerambycidae
- Genus: Parmena
- Species: P. solieri

Binomial name
- Parmena solieri Mulsant, 1839

Synonyms
- Parmena pilosa Solier, 1835 nec Brullé, 1832; Parmena solieri lanzai Sama, 1985

Species of beetle

Parmena solieri is a species of beetle in the family Cerambycidae. It was described by Mulsant in 1839. It is known from France, Sardinia, Corsica, Italy, the Balearic Islands, and Spain.

== Subspecies ==
- Parmena solieri breuningi Vives, 1979
- Parmena solieri solieri Mulsant, 1839
