= Mesolita antennalis =

Scientific classification
- Domain: Eukaryota
- Kingdom: Animalia
- Phylum: Arthropoda
- Class: Insecta
- Order: Coleoptera
- Suborder: Polyphaga
- Infraorder: Cucujiformia
- Family: Cerambycidae
- Genus: Mesolita
- Species: M. antennalis

Binomial name
- Mesolita antennalis Carter, 1929

Species of beetle

Mesolita antennalis is a species of beetle in the family Cerambycidae. It was described by Carter in 1929. It is known from Australia.
