= Cleptonotus =

Scientific classification
- Kingdom: Animalia
- Phylum: Arthropoda
- Class: Insecta
- Order: Coleoptera
- Suborder: Polyphaga
- Infraorder: Cucujiformia
- Family: Cerambycidae
- Tribe: Parmenini
- Genus: Cleptonotus; Breuning, 1950

Species
- See text

Genus of beetles

Cleptonotus is a genus of longhorn beetles of the subfamily Lamiinae, containing the following species:

- Cleptonotus albomaculatus (Blanchard in Gay, 1851)
- Cleptonotus subarmatus (Fairmaire & Germain, 1859)
