= Echthistatus spinulosus =

Scientific classification
- Domain: Eukaryota
- Kingdom: Animalia
- Phylum: Arthropoda
- Class: Insecta
- Order: Coleoptera
- Suborder: Polyphaga
- Infraorder: Cucujiformia
- Family: Cerambycidae
- Genus: Echthistatus
- Species: E. spinulosus

Binomial name
- Echthistatus spinulosus Pascoe, 1862

Synonyms
- Echthistatus spinosus Pascoe, 1862; Echistatus spinosus Pascoe, 1862 (misspelling)

Species of beetle

Echthistatus spinulosus is a species of beetle in the family Cerambycidae. It was described by Francis Polkinghorne Pascoe in 1862. It is known from Mexico.
