= Microtragus luctuosus =

Scientific classification
- Domain: Eukaryota
- Kingdom: Animalia
- Phylum: Arthropoda
- Class: Insecta
- Order: Coleoptera
- Suborder: Polyphaga
- Infraorder: Cucujiformia
- Family: Cerambycidae
- Genus: Microtragus
- Species: M. luctuosus

Binomial name
- Microtragus luctuosus (Shuckard, 1838)

Species of beetle

Microtragus luctuosus is a species of beetle in the family Cerambycidae. It was described by Shuckard in 1838. It is known from Australia.
