= Schreiteria (beetle) =

Scientific classification
- Kingdom: Animalia
- Phylum: Arthropoda
- Class: Insecta
- Order: Coleoptera
- Suborder: Polyphaga
- Infraorder: Cucujiformia
- Family: Cerambycidae
- Tribe: Parmenini
- Genus: Schreiteria; Melzer, 1933

Species
- See text

Genus of beetles

Schreiteria is a genus of longhorn beetles of the subfamily Lamiinae, containing the following species:

- Schreiteria bruchi Melzer, 1933
- Schreiteria colombiana Monne & Monne, 2006
