= Microtragus gazellae =

Scientific classification
- Domain: Eukaryota
- Kingdom: Animalia
- Phylum: Arthropoda
- Class: Insecta
- Order: Coleoptera
- Suborder: Polyphaga
- Infraorder: Cucujiformia
- Family: Cerambycidae
- Genus: Microtragus
- Species: M. gazellae

Binomial name
- Microtragus gazellae Kriesche, 1923

Species of beetle

Microtragus gazellae is a species of beetle in the family Cerambycidae. It was described by R. Kriesche in 1923.
