= Nanilla =

Scientific classification
- Kingdom: Animalia
- Phylum: Arthropoda
- Class: Insecta
- Order: Coleoptera
- Suborder: Polyphaga
- Infraorder: Cucujiformia
- Family: Cerambycidae
- Tribe: Parmenini
- Genus: Nanilla; Fleutiaux & Sallé, 1889

Species
- See text

Genus of beetles

Nanilla is a genus of longhorn beetles of the subfamily Lamiinae, containing the following species:

- Nanilla delauneyi Fleutiaux & Sallé, 1889
- Nanilla globosa Zayas, 1975
- Nanilla terrestris Zayas, 1975
- Nanilla tuberculata Fisher, 1935
