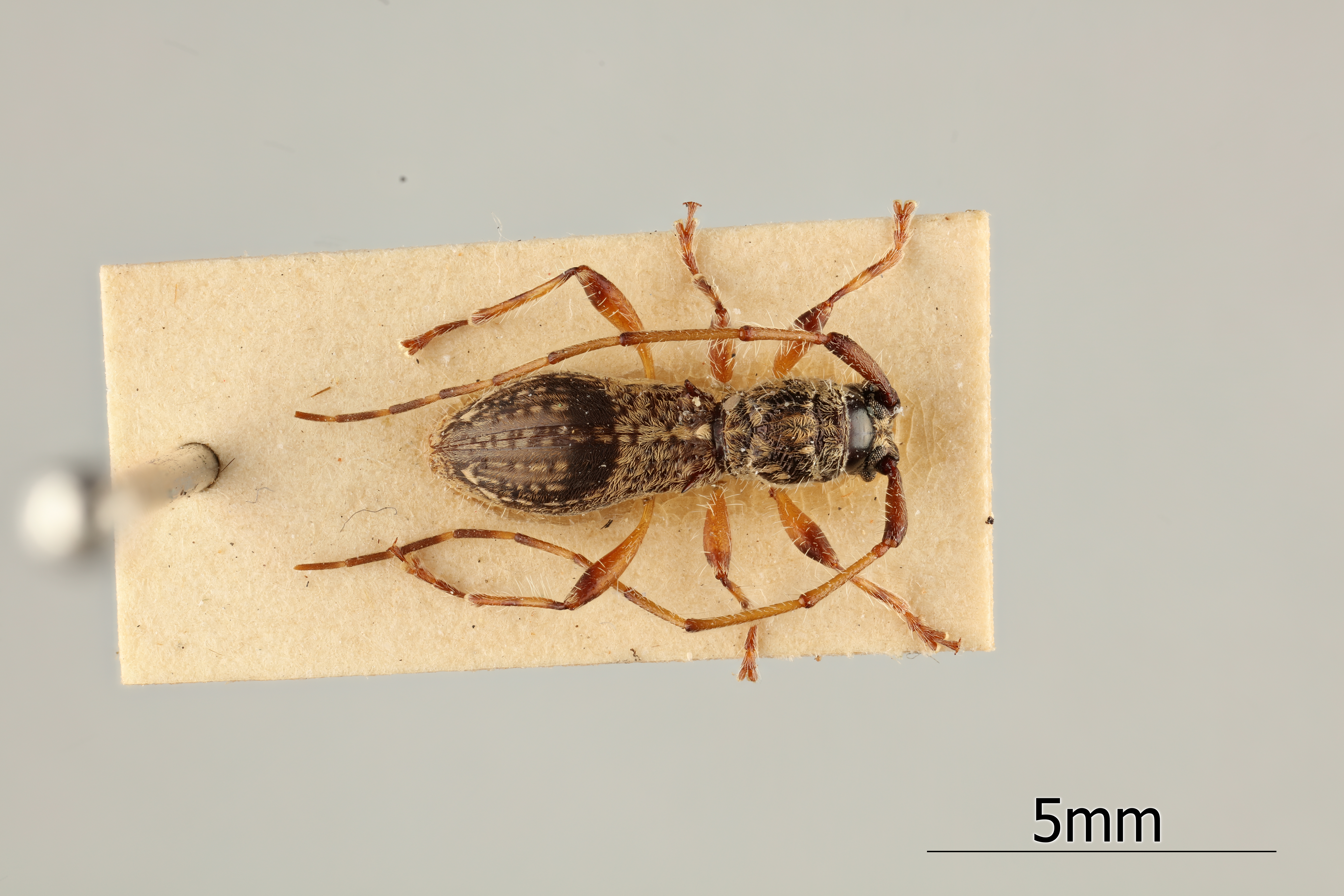
- Tricondyloides persimilis

Scientific classification
- Kingdom: Animalia
- Phylum: Arthropoda
- Clade: Pancrustacea
- Class: Insecta
- Order: Coleoptera
- Suborder: Polyphaga
- Infraorder: Cucujiformia
- Family: Cerambycidae
- Genus: Tricondyloides
- Species: T. persimilis

Binomial name
- Tricondyloides persimilis Breuning, 1939

Synonyms
- Tricondyloides breviscapus Breuning, 1939

= Tricondyloides persimilis =

Species of beetle

Tricondyloides persimilis is a species of beetle in the family Cerambycidae. It was described by Stephan von Breuning in 1939. Its type locality is Mt. St. Arago, New Caledonia.

It was synonymized in with T. breviscapus in 2010. T. breviscapus's type location is central New Caledonia and its initial description recorded a length of 6 mm and a width of 1.5 mm.

T. persimilis feeds on Plerandra gabriellae.
