= Ceraegidion horrens =

Scientific classification
- Kingdom: Animalia
- Phylum: Arthropoda
- Class: Insecta
- Order: Coleoptera
- Suborder: Polyphaga
- Infraorder: Cucujiformia
- Family: Cerambycidae
- Genus: Ceraegidion
- Species: C. horrens

Binomial name
- Ceraegidion horrens Boisduval, 1835

Species of beetle

Ceraegidion horrens is a species of beetle in the family Cerambycidae. It was described by Jean Baptiste Boisduval in 1835. It is known from Australia.
