= Microtragus arachne =

Scientific classification
- Domain: Eukaryota
- Kingdom: Animalia
- Phylum: Arthropoda
- Class: Insecta
- Order: Coleoptera
- Suborder: Polyphaga
- Infraorder: Cucujiformia
- Family: Cerambycidae
- Genus: Microtragus
- Species: M. arachne

Binomial name
- Microtragus arachne Pascoe, 1865

Synonyms
- Microtragus eremita Pascoe, 1865; Microtragus junctus Blackburn, 1889; Microtragus sticticus Pascoe, 1866

Species of beetle

Microtragus arachne is a species of beetle in the family Cerambycidae. It was described by Francis Polkinghorne Pascoe in 1865. It is known from Australia.
