= Neohoplonotus =

Scientific classification
- Kingdom: Animalia
- Phylum: Arthropoda
- Class: Insecta
- Order: Coleoptera
- Suborder: Polyphaga
- Infraorder: Cucujiformia
- Family: Cerambycidae
- Genus: Neohoplonotus; Monné, 2005
- Species: N. spiniferus

Binomial name
- Neohoplonotus spiniferus (Blanchard in Gay, 1851)

Genus of beetles

Neohoplonotus spiniferus is a species of beetle in the family Cerambycidae, and the only species in the genus Neohoplonotus. It was described by Blanchard in Gay 1851.
