= Ipochus insularis =

Scientific classification
- Domain: Eukaryota
- Kingdom: Animalia
- Phylum: Arthropoda
- Class: Insecta
- Order: Coleoptera
- Suborder: Polyphaga
- Infraorder: Cucujiformia
- Family: Cerambycidae
- Genus: Ipochus
- Species: I. insularis

Binomial name
- Ipochus insularis Blaisdell, 1925

Species of beetle

Ipochus insularis is a species of beetle in the family Cerambycidae. It was described by Blaisdell in 1925. It is known from Baja California, in Mexico.
