= Austrosomatidia =

Scientific classification
- Domain: Eukaryota
- Kingdom: Animalia
- Phylum: Arthropoda
- Class: Insecta
- Order: Coleoptera
- Suborder: Polyphaga
- Infraorder: Cucujiformia
- Family: Cerambycidae
- Genus: Austrosomatidia; McKeown, 1945
- Species: A. pulleni

Binomial name
- Austrosomatidia pulleni McKeown, 1945

Genus of beetles

Austrosomatidia pulleni is a species of beetle in the family Cerambycidae, and the only species in the genus Austrosomatidia. It was described by McKeown in 1945.
