= Paracondyloides =

Scientific classification
- Kingdom: Animalia
- Phylum: Arthropoda
- Class: Insecta
- Order: Coleoptera
- Suborder: Polyphaga
- Infraorder: Cucujiformia
- Family: Cerambycidae
- Genus: Paracondyloides; Breuning, 1978
- Species: P. flavofasciatus

Binomial name
- Paracondyloides flavofasciatus Breuning, 1978

Genus of beetles

Paracondyloides flavofasciatus is a species of beetle in the family Cerambycidae, and the only species in the genus Paracondyloides. It was described by Stephan von Breuning in 1978.
