= Bocainella =

Scientific classification
- Domain: Eukaryota
- Kingdom: Animalia
- Phylum: Arthropoda
- Class: Insecta
- Order: Coleoptera
- Suborder: Polyphaga
- Infraorder: Cucujiformia
- Family: Cerambycidae
- Genus: Bocainella; Monné & Monné, 2008
- Species: B. minima

Binomial name
- Bocainella minima Monné & Monné, 2008

Genus of beetles

Bocainella minima is a species of beetle in the family Cerambycidae, and the only species in the genus Bocainella. It was described by Monne and Monne in 2008.
