= Ovaloparmena =

Scientific classification
- Kingdom: Animalia
- Phylum: Arthropoda
- Class: Insecta
- Order: Coleoptera
- Suborder: Polyphaga
- Infraorder: Cucujiformia
- Family: Cerambycidae
- Genus: Ovaloparmena; Breuning & Téocchi, 1983
- Species: O. affinis

Binomial name
- Ovaloparmena affinis (Breuning, 1981)

Synonyms
- Spinosomatidia affinis Breuning, 1981; Ovaloparmena capensis Breuning & Téocchi, 1983; Spinosomatidia tuberipennis Breuning, 1981

Genus of beetles

Ovaloparmena affinis is a species of beetle in the family Cerambycidae, and the only species in the genus Ovaloparmena. It was described by Stephan von Breuning in 1981.
