= Spinhoplathemistus =

Scientific classification
- Kingdom: Animalia
- Phylum: Arthropoda
- Class: Insecta
- Order: Coleoptera
- Suborder: Polyphaga
- Infraorder: Cucujiformia
- Family: Cerambycidae
- Genus: Spinhoplathemistus; Breuning, 1973
- Species: S. kaszabi

Binomial name
- Spinhoplathemistus kaszabi Breuning, 1973

Genus of beetles

Spinhoplathemistus kaszabi is a species of beetle in the family Cerambycidae, and the only species in the genus Spinhoplathemistus. It was described by Stephan von Breuning in 1973.
