= Parmenopsis =

Scientific classification
- Kingdom: Animalia
- Phylum: Arthropoda
- Class: Insecta
- Order: Coleoptera
- Suborder: Polyphaga
- Infraorder: Cucujiformia
- Family: Cerambycidae
- Genus: Parmenopsis; Ganglbauer, 1881
- Species: P. caucasica

Binomial name
- Parmenopsis caucasica (Leder, 1879)

Genus of beetles

Parmenopsis caucasica is a species of beetle in the family Cerambycidae, and the only species in the genus Parmenopsis. It was described by Leder in 1879.
