= Caledomicrus =

Scientific classification
- Kingdom: Animalia
- Phylum: Arthropoda
- Class: Insecta
- Order: Coleoptera
- Suborder: Polyphaga
- Infraorder: Cucujiformia
- Family: Cerambycidae
- Genus: Caledomicrus; Vives, Sudre, Mille & Cazères, 2011
- Species: C. mimeticus

Binomial name
- Caledomicrus mimeticus Vives, Sudre, Mille & Cazères, 2011

Genus of beetles

Caledomicrus mimeticus is a species of beetle in the family Cerambycidae, and the only species in the genus Caledomicrus. It was described by Vives, Sudre, Mille and Cazères in 2011.
