= Cleptosoma =

Scientific classification
- Kingdom: Animalia
- Phylum: Arthropoda
- Class: Insecta
- Order: Coleoptera
- Suborder: Polyphaga
- Infraorder: Cucujiformia
- Family: Cerambycidae
- Genus: Cleptosoma; Breuning, 1950
- Species: C. clavipes

Binomial name
- Cleptosoma clavipes (Blanchard in Gay, 1851)

Synonyms
- Species synonymy: Microcleptes clavipes Strauch, 1861; Parmena clavipes Blanchard, 1851

Genus of beetles

Cleptosoma clavipes is a species of beetle in the family Cerambycidae, and the only species in the genus Cleptosoma. It was described by Blanchard in 1851.
