= Blaxotes =

Scientific classification
- Domain: Eukaryota
- Kingdom: Animalia
- Phylum: Arthropoda
- Class: Insecta
- Order: Coleoptera
- Suborder: Polyphaga
- Infraorder: Cucujiformia
- Family: Cerambycidae
- Genus: Blaxotes
- Species: B. wollastoni

Binomial name
- Blaxotes wollastoni (White, 1856)

Genus of beetles

Blaxotes wollastoni is a species of beetle in the family Cerambycidae, and the only species in the genus Blaxotes. It was described by White in 1856.
