= Neoplectrura =

Scientific classification
- Domain: Eukaryota
- Kingdom: Animalia
- Phylum: Arthropoda
- Class: Insecta
- Order: Coleoptera
- Suborder: Polyphaga
- Infraorder: Cucujiformia
- Family: Cerambycidae
- Genus: Neoplectrura; Chemsak & Linsley, 1983
- Species: N. breedlovei

Binomial name
- Neoplectrura breedlovei Chemsak & Linsley, 1983

Genus of beetles

Neoplectrura breedlovei is a species of beetle in the family Cerambycidae, and the only species in the genus Neoplectrura. It was described by Chemsak and Linsley in 1983.
