= Rugosocleptes =

Scientific classification
- Kingdom: Animalia
- Phylum: Arthropoda
- Class: Insecta
- Order: Coleoptera
- Suborder: Polyphaga
- Infraorder: Cucujiformia
- Family: Cerambycidae
- Genus: Rugosocleptes; Breuning, 1951
- Species: R. rugicollis

Binomial name
- Rugosocleptes rugicollis (Fauvel, 1906)

Synonyms
- Species synonymy: Microcleptes rugicollis Fauvel, 1906; Parasomatidia kaszabi Breuning, 1978

Genus of beetles

Rugosocleptes rugicollis is a species of beetle in the family Cerambycidae, and the only species in the genus Rugosocleptes. It was described by Fauvel in 1906.
