= Tricondyloides =

Scientific classification
- Domain: Eukaryota
- Kingdom: Animalia
- Phylum: Arthropoda
- Class: Insecta
- Order: Coleoptera
- Suborder: Polyphaga
- Infraorder: Cucujiformia
- Family: Cerambycidae
- Subfamily: Lamiinae
- Tribe: Parmenini
- Genus: Tricondyloides; Montrouzier, 1861

Species
- See text

Genus of beetles

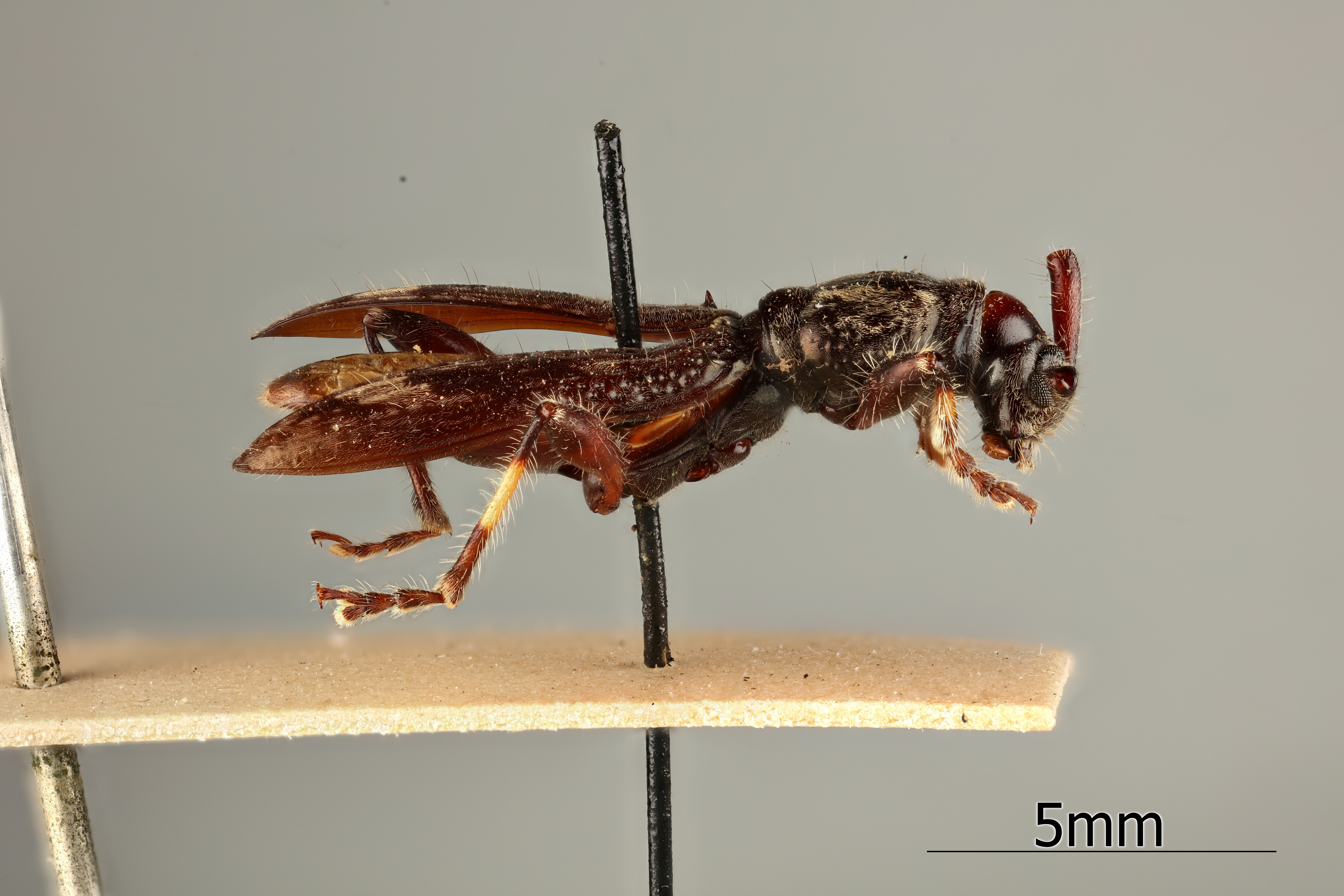
Tricondyloides elongatus

Tricondyloides is a genus of longhorn beetles of the subfamily Lamiinae, containing the following species:

- Tricondyloides armatus Montrouzier, 1861
- Tricondyloides caledonicus Breuning, 1947
- Tricondyloides elongatus Breuning, 1939
- Tricondyloides inermis Breuning, 1939
- Tricondyloides persimilis Breuning, 1939
- Tricondyloides rugifrons Breuning, 1951
