= Stychoparmena =

Scientific classification
- Kingdom: Animalia
- Phylum: Arthropoda
- Class: Insecta
- Order: Coleoptera
- Suborder: Polyphaga
- Infraorder: Cucujiformia
- Family: Cerambycidae
- Genus: Stychoparmena
- Species: S. spinipennis

Binomial name
- Stychoparmena spinipennis Breuning, 1939

Genus of beetles

Stychoparmena spinipennis is a species of beetle in the family Cerambycidae, and the only species in the genus Stychoparmena. It was described by Stephan von Breuning in 1939.
