= Declivocondyloides =

Scientific classification
- Domain: Eukaryota
- Kingdom: Animalia
- Phylum: Arthropoda
- Class: Insecta
- Order: Coleoptera
- Suborder: Polyphaga
- Infraorder: Cucujiformia
- Family: Cerambycidae
- Genus: Declivocondyloides; Sudre, 2001
- Species: D. loebli

Binomial name
- Declivocondyloides loebli Sudre, 2001

Genus of beetles

Declivocondyloides loebli is a species of beetle in the family Cerambycidae, and the only species in the genus Declivocondyloides. It was described by Sudre in 2001.
