= Microcleptes =

Scientific classification
- Domain: Eukaryota
- Kingdom: Animalia
- Phylum: Arthropoda
- Class: Insecta
- Order: Coleoptera
- Suborder: Polyphaga
- Infraorder: Cucujiformia
- Family: Cerambycidae
- Tribe: Parmenini
- Genus: Microcleptes; Newman, 1840

Species
- See text

Genus of beetles

Microcleptes is a genus of longhorn beetles of the subfamily Lamiinae, containing the following species:

- Microcleptes aranea Newman, 1840
- Microcleptes variolosus Fairmaie & Germain, 1859
