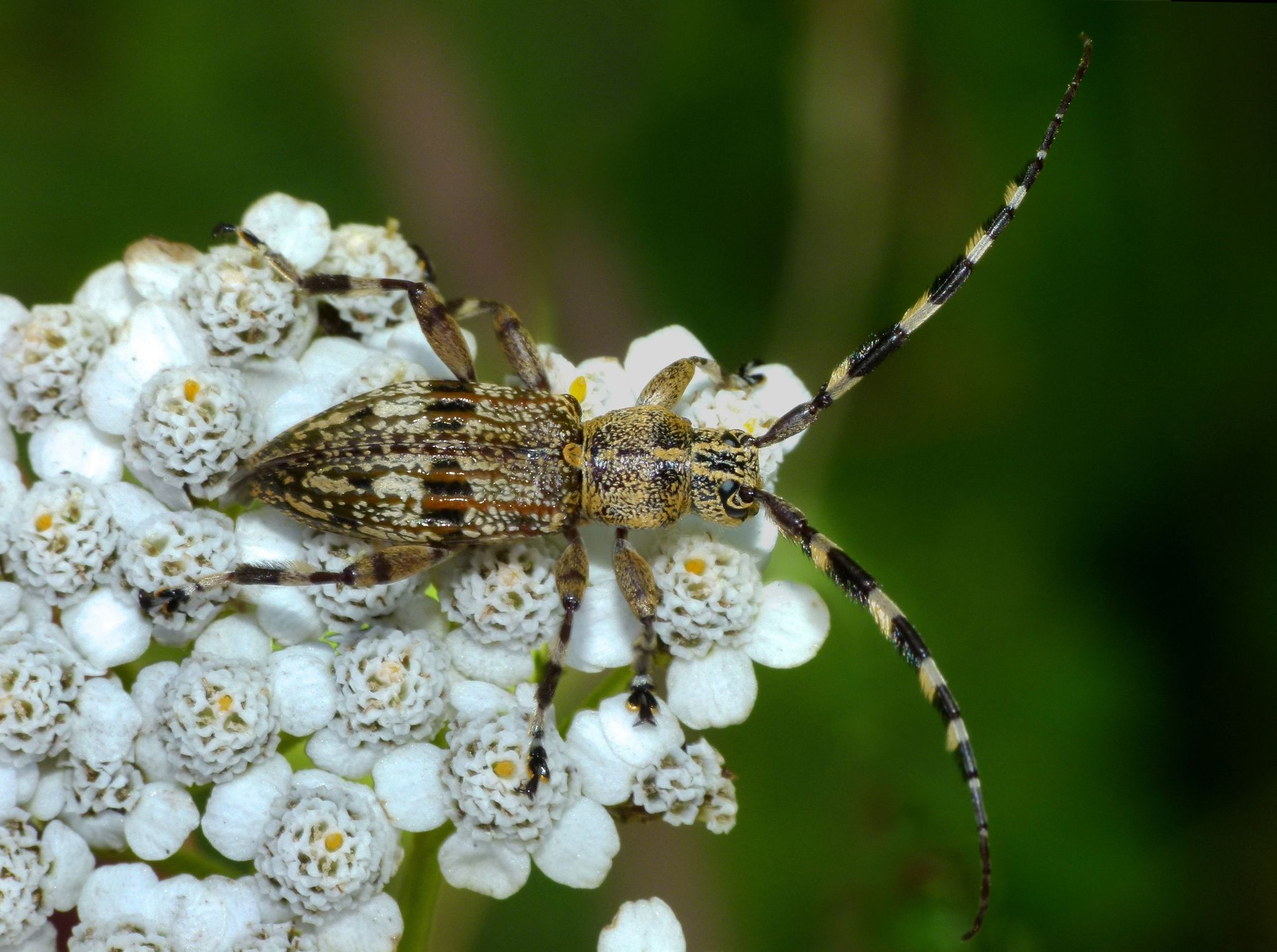

Scientific classification
- Kingdom: Animalia
- Phylum: Arthropoda
- Clade: Pancrustacea
- Class: Insecta
- Order: Coleoptera
- Suborder: Polyphaga
- Infraorder: Cucujiformia
- Family: Cerambycidae
- Genus: Hexatricha; White, 1846
- Species: H. pulverulenta

Binomial name
- Hexatricha pulverulenta (Westwood, 1843)

Synonyms
- Species synonymy: Hexarthrica pulverulenta Thomson, 1864; Lamia pulverulenta Westwood, 1843; Lamia (Hexatricha) pulverulenta White, 1846

= Hexatricha =

Genus of beetles

Hexatricha pulverulenta, commonly known as the squeaking longhorn, is a beetle in the family Cerambycidae, the only species in the monotypic genus Hexatricha. It is endemic to New Zealand. It was first described by John O. Westwood in 1843 as Lamia pulverulenta, and later moved into the genus Hexatricha (sometimes incorrectly spelled Hexathrica).

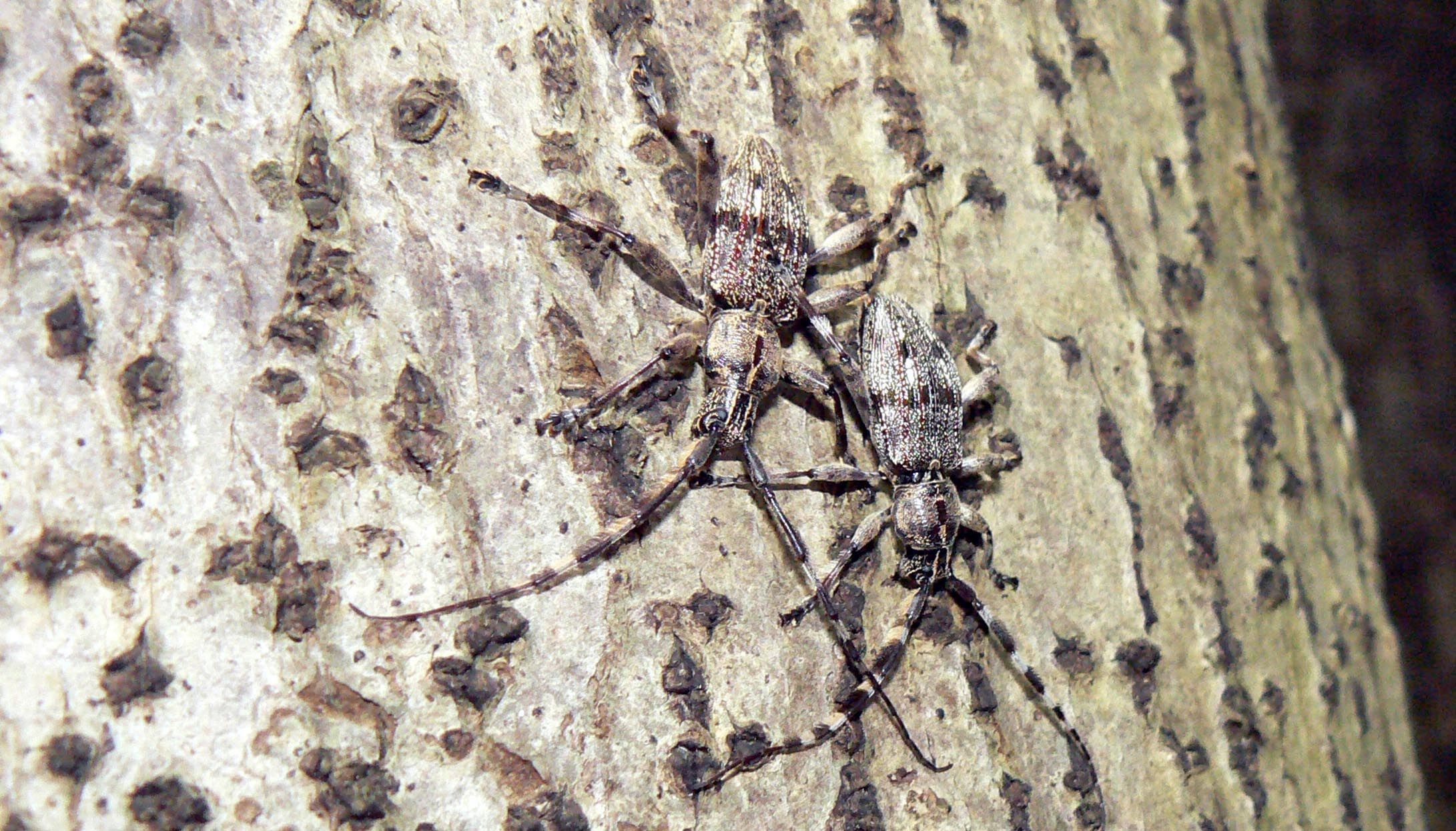
Pair of Hexatricha pulverulenta on a karaka tree (Corynocarpus laevigatus)

The squeaking longhorn is so called for the noise it makes, by stridulation, when handled. Female beetles lay an egg under the bark of dead or dying trees, especially Pinus radiata or New Zealand beech (Nothofagus). These hatch in 10–19 days, and larvae live under, and feed off, wood for perhaps two or three years. They pupate for 30 days, hatching from spring to autumn (August to April) into adult beetles which live for up to three months. Adults are reluctant fliers.
