= Mynoparmena =

Scientific classification
- Kingdom: Animalia
- Phylum: Arthropoda
- Class: Insecta
- Order: Coleoptera
- Suborder: Polyphaga
- Infraorder: Cucujiformia
- Family: Cerambycidae
- Genus: Mynoparmena; Breuning, 1950
- Species: M. dilatata

Binomial name
- Mynoparmena dilatata (Aurivillius, 1926)

Synonyms
- Species synonymy: Mynonebra dilatata Aurivillius, 1926

Genus of beetles

Mynoparmena dilatata is a species of beetle in the family Cerambycidae, and the only species in the genus Mynoparmena. It was described by Per Olof Christopher Aurivillius in 1926.
