= Plaumanniella =

Scientific classification
- Kingdom: Animalia
- Phylum: Arthropoda
- Clade: Pancrustacea
- Class: Insecta
- Order: Coleoptera
- Suborder: Polyphaga
- Infraorder: Cucujiformia
- Family: Cerambycidae
- Genus: Plaumanniella; Fisher, 1938
- Species: P. novateutoniae

Binomial name
- Plaumanniella novateutoniae Fisher, 1938

Genus of beetles

Plaumanniella novateutoniae is a species of beetle in the family Cerambycidae, and the only species in the genus Plaumanniella. It was described by Fisher in 1938. It is found in Brazil (Santa Catarina, Rio Grande do Sul, Paraná).
