= Arachneosomatidia =

Scientific classification
- Domain: Eukaryota
- Kingdom: Animalia
- Phylum: Arthropoda
- Class: Insecta
- Order: Coleoptera
- Suborder: Polyphaga
- Infraorder: Cucujiformia
- Family: Cerambycidae
- Genus: Arachneosomatidia; Sudre, 2001
- Species: A. beatriceae

Binomial name
- Arachneosomatidia beatriceae Sudre, 2001

Genus of beetles

Arachneosomatidia beatriceae is a species of beetle in the family Cerambycidae, and the only species in the genus Arachneosomatidia. It was described by Sudre in 2001.
