= Cupeyalia =

Scientific classification
- Kingdom: Animalia
- Phylum: Arthropoda
- Class: Insecta
- Order: Coleoptera
- Suborder: Polyphaga
- Infraorder: Cucujiformia
- Family: Cerambycidae
- Genus: Cupeyalia; Zayas, 1975
- Species: C. subterranea

Binomial name
- Cupeyalia subterranea Zayas, 1975

Genus of beetles

Cupeyalia subterranea is a species of beetle in the family Cerambycidae, and the only species in the genus Cupeyalia. It was described by Zayas in 1975.
