= Myrmeparmena =

Scientific classification
- Kingdom: Animalia
- Phylum: Arthropoda
- Class: Insecta
- Order: Coleoptera
- Suborder: Polyphaga
- Infraorder: Cucujiformia
- Family: Cerambycidae
- Genus: Myrmeparmena; Vives, 2012
- Species: M. sudrei

Binomial name
- Myrmeparmena sudrei Vives, 2012

Genus of beetles

Myrmeparmena sudrei is a species of beetle in the family Cerambycidae, and the only species in the genus Myrmeparmena. It was described by Vives in 2012.
