= Neosomatidia =

Scientific classification
- Kingdom: Animalia
- Phylum: Arthropoda
- Class: Insecta
- Order: Coleoptera
- Suborder: Polyphaga
- Infraorder: Cucujiformia
- Family: Cerambycidae
- Genus: Neosomatidia; Breuning, 1978
- Species: N. bipustulata

Binomial name
- Neosomatidia bipustulata Breuning, 1978

Genus of beetles

Neosomatidia bipustulata is a species of beetle in the family Cerambycidae, and the only species in the genus Neosomatidia. It was described by Stephan von Breuning in 1978.

== See also ==
- Longhorn beetles
- Catalogue of Life
