= Ceylanoparmena =

Scientific classification
- Kingdom: Animalia
- Phylum: Arthropoda
- Class: Insecta
- Order: Coleoptera
- Suborder: Polyphaga
- Infraorder: Cucujiformia
- Family: Cerambycidae
- Genus: Ceylanoparmena; Breuning, 1971
- Species: C. loebli

Binomial name
- Ceylanoparmena loebli Breuning, 1971

Genus of beetles

Ceylanoparmena loebli is a species of beetle in the family Cerambycidae, and the only species in the genus Ceylanoparmena. It was described by Stephan von Breuning in 1971.
