= Parananilla =

Scientific classification
- Kingdom: Animalia
- Phylum: Arthropoda
- Class: Insecta
- Order: Coleoptera
- Suborder: Polyphaga
- Infraorder: Cucujiformia
- Family: Cerambycidae
- Genus: Parananilla; Breuning, 1956
- Species: P. mexicana

Binomial name
- Parananilla mexicana Breuning, 1956

Genus of beetles

Parananilla mexicana is a species of beetle in the family Cerambycidae, and the only species in the genus Parananilla. It was described by Stephan von Breuning in 1956.
